

326001–326100 

|-bgcolor=#E9E9E9
| 326001 ||  || — || April 24, 2003 || Anderson Mesa || LONEOS || — || align=right | 2.0 km || 
|-id=002 bgcolor=#E9E9E9
| 326002 ||  || — || October 9, 2005 || Kitt Peak || Spacewatch || — || align=right | 1.5 km || 
|-id=003 bgcolor=#fefefe
| 326003 ||  || — || April 17, 2001 || Kitt Peak || Spacewatch || V || align=right data-sort-value="0.73" | 730 m || 
|-id=004 bgcolor=#d6d6d6
| 326004 ||  || — || March 15, 2007 || Mount Lemmon || Mount Lemmon Survey || HYG || align=right | 3.7 km || 
|-id=005 bgcolor=#E9E9E9
| 326005 ||  || — || January 27, 2007 || Mount Lemmon || Mount Lemmon Survey || HOF || align=right | 2.8 km || 
|-id=006 bgcolor=#E9E9E9
| 326006 ||  || — || November 16, 2001 || Kitt Peak || Spacewatch || — || align=right | 1.3 km || 
|-id=007 bgcolor=#fefefe
| 326007 ||  || — || April 16, 2005 || Kitt Peak || Spacewatch || — || align=right data-sort-value="0.85" | 850 m || 
|-id=008 bgcolor=#E9E9E9
| 326008 ||  || — || December 22, 2006 || Kitt Peak || Spacewatch || — || align=right | 1.4 km || 
|-id=009 bgcolor=#fefefe
| 326009 ||  || — || December 17, 2003 || Kitt Peak || Spacewatch || — || align=right | 1.1 km || 
|-id=010 bgcolor=#fefefe
| 326010 ||  || — || September 14, 2006 || Catalina || CSS || V || align=right data-sort-value="0.66" | 660 m || 
|-id=011 bgcolor=#E9E9E9
| 326011 ||  || — || December 27, 2006 || Mount Lemmon || Mount Lemmon Survey || HOF || align=right | 3.0 km || 
|-id=012 bgcolor=#fefefe
| 326012 ||  || — || October 5, 2002 || Socorro || LINEAR || V || align=right data-sort-value="0.79" | 790 m || 
|-id=013 bgcolor=#fefefe
| 326013 ||  || — || September 20, 2003 || Campo Imperatore || CINEOS || — || align=right data-sort-value="0.98" | 980 m || 
|-id=014 bgcolor=#E9E9E9
| 326014 ||  || — || November 6, 2005 || Mount Lemmon || Mount Lemmon Survey || — || align=right | 2.9 km || 
|-id=015 bgcolor=#d6d6d6
| 326015 ||  || — || December 14, 2004 || Kitt Peak || Spacewatch || — || align=right | 4.3 km || 
|-id=016 bgcolor=#E9E9E9
| 326016 ||  || — || October 6, 2005 || Mount Lemmon || Mount Lemmon Survey || — || align=right | 1.5 km || 
|-id=017 bgcolor=#E9E9E9
| 326017 ||  || — || November 1, 1997 || Kitt Peak || Spacewatch || — || align=right | 1.4 km || 
|-id=018 bgcolor=#E9E9E9
| 326018 ||  || — || December 18, 2001 || Kitt Peak || Spacewatch || — || align=right | 3.3 km || 
|-id=019 bgcolor=#E9E9E9
| 326019 ||  || — || September 14, 2005 || Kitt Peak || Spacewatch || — || align=right | 1.7 km || 
|-id=020 bgcolor=#fefefe
| 326020 ||  || — || October 28, 2006 || Mount Lemmon || Mount Lemmon Survey || — || align=right data-sort-value="0.87" | 870 m || 
|-id=021 bgcolor=#d6d6d6
| 326021 ||  || — || October 15, 2004 || Mount Lemmon || Mount Lemmon Survey || — || align=right | 3.7 km || 
|-id=022 bgcolor=#d6d6d6
| 326022 ||  || — || March 20, 2007 || Catalina || CSS || — || align=right | 3.1 km || 
|-id=023 bgcolor=#fefefe
| 326023 ||  || — || March 13, 2002 || Kitt Peak || Spacewatch || — || align=right | 1.0 km || 
|-id=024 bgcolor=#E9E9E9
| 326024 ||  || — || September 28, 2006 || Mount Lemmon || Mount Lemmon Survey || — || align=right | 1.8 km || 
|-id=025 bgcolor=#E9E9E9
| 326025 ||  || — || September 29, 2005 || Mount Lemmon || Mount Lemmon Survey || — || align=right | 1.6 km || 
|-id=026 bgcolor=#E9E9E9
| 326026 ||  || — || February 27, 2008 || Mount Lemmon || Mount Lemmon Survey || — || align=right | 1.6 km || 
|-id=027 bgcolor=#E9E9E9
| 326027 ||  || — || September 26, 2006 || Kitt Peak || Spacewatch || — || align=right | 1.6 km || 
|-id=028 bgcolor=#d6d6d6
| 326028 ||  || — || December 24, 2005 || Kitt Peak || Spacewatch || — || align=right | 3.3 km || 
|-id=029 bgcolor=#fefefe
| 326029 ||  || — || October 28, 2006 || Kitt Peak || Spacewatch || MAS || align=right data-sort-value="0.93" | 930 m || 
|-id=030 bgcolor=#d6d6d6
| 326030 ||  || — || November 12, 1999 || Socorro || LINEAR || — || align=right | 3.1 km || 
|-id=031 bgcolor=#d6d6d6
| 326031 ||  || — || October 31, 2005 || Kitt Peak || Spacewatch || 628 || align=right | 1.7 km || 
|-id=032 bgcolor=#E9E9E9
| 326032 ||  || — || December 13, 2006 || Kitt Peak || Spacewatch || AER || align=right | 1.9 km || 
|-id=033 bgcolor=#d6d6d6
| 326033 ||  || — || January 2, 2001 || Kitt Peak || Spacewatch || — || align=right | 2.4 km || 
|-id=034 bgcolor=#E9E9E9
| 326034 ||  || — || November 5, 2005 || Catalina || CSS || AGN || align=right | 1.6 km || 
|-id=035 bgcolor=#E9E9E9
| 326035 ||  || — || October 30, 2005 || Kitt Peak || Spacewatch || — || align=right | 2.5 km || 
|-id=036 bgcolor=#d6d6d6
| 326036 ||  || — || September 17, 2009 || Mount Lemmon || Mount Lemmon Survey || — || align=right | 4.2 km || 
|-id=037 bgcolor=#d6d6d6
| 326037 ||  || — || February 21, 2007 || Catalina || CSS || NAE || align=right | 3.3 km || 
|-id=038 bgcolor=#E9E9E9
| 326038 ||  || — || April 29, 2000 || Kitt Peak || Spacewatch || MAR || align=right | 1.1 km || 
|-id=039 bgcolor=#d6d6d6
| 326039 ||  || — || July 20, 2009 || Siding Spring || SSS || SAN || align=right | 2.7 km || 
|-id=040 bgcolor=#d6d6d6
| 326040 ||  || — || December 4, 2005 || Kitt Peak || Spacewatch || — || align=right | 2.9 km || 
|-id=041 bgcolor=#d6d6d6
| 326041 ||  || — || October 29, 1999 || Kitt Peak || Spacewatch || — || align=right | 2.5 km || 
|-id=042 bgcolor=#d6d6d6
| 326042 ||  || — || February 23, 2007 || Kitt Peak || Spacewatch || — || align=right | 2.8 km || 
|-id=043 bgcolor=#E9E9E9
| 326043 ||  || — || December 14, 2006 || Palomar || NEAT || MAR || align=right | 1.5 km || 
|-id=044 bgcolor=#d6d6d6
| 326044 ||  || — || December 26, 2005 || Kitt Peak || Spacewatch || — || align=right | 3.4 km || 
|-id=045 bgcolor=#E9E9E9
| 326045 ||  || — || September 23, 2005 || Kitt Peak || Spacewatch || — || align=right | 1.3 km || 
|-id=046 bgcolor=#d6d6d6
| 326046 ||  || — || December 14, 2004 || Socorro || LINEAR || — || align=right | 4.2 km || 
|-id=047 bgcolor=#d6d6d6
| 326047 ||  || — || January 23, 2006 || Kitt Peak || Spacewatch || — || align=right | 2.6 km || 
|-id=048 bgcolor=#d6d6d6
| 326048 ||  || — || October 14, 2010 || Mount Lemmon || Mount Lemmon Survey || — || align=right | 3.7 km || 
|-id=049 bgcolor=#E9E9E9
| 326049 ||  || — || February 21, 2007 || Kitt Peak || Spacewatch || — || align=right | 2.6 km || 
|-id=050 bgcolor=#d6d6d6
| 326050 ||  || — || October 20, 2009 || Siding Spring || SSS || ALA || align=right | 4.8 km || 
|-id=051 bgcolor=#d6d6d6
| 326051 ||  || — || May 12, 2007 || Mount Lemmon || Mount Lemmon Survey || — || align=right | 3.4 km || 
|-id=052 bgcolor=#d6d6d6
| 326052 ||  || — || October 1, 2009 || Mount Lemmon || Mount Lemmon Survey || — || align=right | 4.0 km || 
|-id=053 bgcolor=#d6d6d6
| 326053 ||  || — || October 21, 1995 || Kitt Peak || Spacewatch || 7:4 || align=right | 4.0 km || 
|-id=054 bgcolor=#d6d6d6
| 326054 ||  || — || August 4, 2003 || Kitt Peak || Spacewatch || THB || align=right | 3.8 km || 
|-id=055 bgcolor=#d6d6d6
| 326055 ||  || — || January 17, 2010 || WISE || WISE || SYL7:4 || align=right | 4.2 km || 
|-id=056 bgcolor=#d6d6d6
| 326056 ||  || — || March 4, 2000 || Socorro || LINEAR || — || align=right | 5.7 km || 
|-id=057 bgcolor=#d6d6d6
| 326057 ||  || — || October 2, 2009 || Mount Lemmon || Mount Lemmon Survey || — || align=right | 4.5 km || 
|-id=058 bgcolor=#d6d6d6
| 326058 ||  || — || December 10, 2004 || Kitt Peak || Spacewatch || — || align=right | 4.6 km || 
|-id=059 bgcolor=#d6d6d6
| 326059 ||  || — || August 20, 2001 || Cerro Tololo || M. W. Buie || SYL7:4 || align=right | 3.7 km || 
|-id=060 bgcolor=#E9E9E9
| 326060 ||  || — || February 23, 2007 || Mount Lemmon || Mount Lemmon Survey || MRX || align=right | 1.3 km || 
|-id=061 bgcolor=#d6d6d6
| 326061 ||  || — || April 25, 2007 || Mount Lemmon || Mount Lemmon Survey || — || align=right | 4.5 km || 
|-id=062 bgcolor=#d6d6d6
| 326062 ||  || — || October 1, 2009 || Mount Lemmon || Mount Lemmon Survey || EOS || align=right | 2.5 km || 
|-id=063 bgcolor=#d6d6d6
| 326063 ||  || — || February 27, 2006 || Kitt Peak || Spacewatch || THM || align=right | 2.5 km || 
|-id=064 bgcolor=#d6d6d6
| 326064 ||  || — || October 26, 2009 || Kitt Peak || Spacewatch || SHU3:2 || align=right | 3.8 km || 
|-id=065 bgcolor=#d6d6d6
| 326065 ||  || — || April 11, 2002 || Palomar || NEAT || — || align=right | 3.6 km || 
|-id=066 bgcolor=#E9E9E9
| 326066 ||  || — || December 21, 2006 || Mount Lemmon || Mount Lemmon Survey || — || align=right | 1.3 km || 
|-id=067 bgcolor=#E9E9E9
| 326067 ||  || — || May 3, 2008 || Mount Lemmon || Mount Lemmon Survey || — || align=right | 2.2 km || 
|-id=068 bgcolor=#d6d6d6
| 326068 ||  || — || April 25, 2007 || Mount Lemmon || Mount Lemmon Survey || — || align=right | 4.5 km || 
|-id=069 bgcolor=#d6d6d6
| 326069 ||  || — || October 23, 2009 || Mount Lemmon || Mount Lemmon Survey || SHU3:2 || align=right | 6.3 km || 
|-id=070 bgcolor=#d6d6d6
| 326070 ||  || — || November 22, 2009 || Catalina || CSS || 7:4 || align=right | 4.2 km || 
|-id=071 bgcolor=#d6d6d6
| 326071 ||  || — || September 16, 2003 || Palomar || NEAT || HYG || align=right | 3.8 km || 
|-id=072 bgcolor=#d6d6d6
| 326072 ||  || — || January 23, 2006 || Kitt Peak || Spacewatch || — || align=right | 2.8 km || 
|-id=073 bgcolor=#d6d6d6
| 326073 ||  || — || August 23, 2003 || Palomar || NEAT || — || align=right | 4.1 km || 
|-id=074 bgcolor=#E9E9E9
| 326074 ||  || — || July 21, 2004 || Siding Spring || SSS || — || align=right | 2.1 km || 
|-id=075 bgcolor=#d6d6d6
| 326075 ||  || — || April 16, 2001 || Kitt Peak || Spacewatch || THM || align=right | 2.7 km || 
|-id=076 bgcolor=#E9E9E9
| 326076 ||  || — || October 7, 2005 || Anderson Mesa || LONEOS || — || align=right | 2.1 km || 
|-id=077 bgcolor=#d6d6d6
| 326077 ||  || — || September 5, 2008 || Kitt Peak || Spacewatch || 3:2 || align=right | 6.1 km || 
|-id=078 bgcolor=#E9E9E9
| 326078 ||  || — || May 31, 2008 || Kitt Peak || Spacewatch || — || align=right | 2.5 km || 
|-id=079 bgcolor=#d6d6d6
| 326079 ||  || — || November 10, 2004 || Kitt Peak || Spacewatch || — || align=right | 4.6 km || 
|-id=080 bgcolor=#d6d6d6
| 326080 ||  || — || December 2, 2005 || Kitt Peak || Spacewatch || CHA || align=right | 2.1 km || 
|-id=081 bgcolor=#d6d6d6
| 326081 ||  || — || November 15, 2009 || Hibiscus || N. Teamo || — || align=right | 3.5 km || 
|-id=082 bgcolor=#d6d6d6
| 326082 ||  || — || September 22, 2009 || Kitt Peak || Spacewatch || — || align=right | 2.7 km || 
|-id=083 bgcolor=#d6d6d6
| 326083 ||  || — || December 1, 2005 || Mount Lemmon || Mount Lemmon Survey || SAN || align=right | 4.4 km || 
|-id=084 bgcolor=#d6d6d6
| 326084 ||  || — || October 18, 2009 || Kitt Peak || Spacewatch || SHU3:2 || align=right | 5.9 km || 
|-id=085 bgcolor=#d6d6d6
| 326085 ||  || — || March 21, 2001 || Anderson Mesa || LONEOS || — || align=right | 4.3 km || 
|-id=086 bgcolor=#d6d6d6
| 326086 ||  || — || December 13, 2004 || Kitt Peak || Spacewatch || — || align=right | 3.9 km || 
|-id=087 bgcolor=#d6d6d6
| 326087 ||  || — || December 3, 2005 || Mauna Kea || A. Boattini || — || align=right | 4.9 km || 
|-id=088 bgcolor=#d6d6d6
| 326088 ||  || — || February 24, 2006 || Kitt Peak || Spacewatch || — || align=right | 2.8 km || 
|-id=089 bgcolor=#d6d6d6
| 326089 ||  || — || May 7, 2007 || Kitt Peak || Spacewatch || — || align=right | 4.4 km || 
|-id=090 bgcolor=#d6d6d6
| 326090 ||  || — || September 22, 2003 || Palomar || NEAT || — || align=right | 4.4 km || 
|-id=091 bgcolor=#d6d6d6
| 326091 ||  || — || April 22, 2007 || Mount Lemmon || Mount Lemmon Survey || — || align=right | 4.2 km || 
|-id=092 bgcolor=#d6d6d6
| 326092 ||  || — || November 26, 2003 || Kitt Peak || Spacewatch || 7:4 || align=right | 4.8 km || 
|-id=093 bgcolor=#fefefe
| 326093 ||  || — || June 23, 2009 || Mount Lemmon || Mount Lemmon Survey || — || align=right | 1.1 km || 
|-id=094 bgcolor=#d6d6d6
| 326094 ||  || — || July 3, 1997 || Kitt Peak || Spacewatch || — || align=right | 3.7 km || 
|-id=095 bgcolor=#E9E9E9
| 326095 ||  || — || October 8, 2004 || Kitt Peak || Spacewatch || — || align=right | 2.7 km || 
|-id=096 bgcolor=#d6d6d6
| 326096 ||  || — || April 12, 2002 || Palomar || NEAT || — || align=right | 4.0 km || 
|-id=097 bgcolor=#d6d6d6
| 326097 ||  || — || February 27, 2006 || Kitt Peak || Spacewatch || — || align=right | 3.9 km || 
|-id=098 bgcolor=#E9E9E9
| 326098 ||  || — || June 3, 2008 || Mount Lemmon || Mount Lemmon Survey || HOF || align=right | 2.9 km || 
|-id=099 bgcolor=#d6d6d6
| 326099 ||  || — || March 23, 2004 || Kitt Peak || Spacewatch || 3:2 || align=right | 3.6 km || 
|-id=100 bgcolor=#d6d6d6
| 326100 ||  || — || August 4, 2003 || Kitt Peak || Spacewatch || — || align=right | 4.2 km || 
|}

326101–326200 

|-bgcolor=#d6d6d6
| 326101 ||  || — || October 16, 2003 || Anderson Mesa || LONEOS || EOS || align=right | 3.0 km || 
|-id=102 bgcolor=#E9E9E9
| 326102 ||  || — || February 8, 2007 || Mount Lemmon || Mount Lemmon Survey || — || align=right | 1.1 km || 
|-id=103 bgcolor=#E9E9E9
| 326103 ||  || — || February 21, 2007 || Kitt Peak || Spacewatch || — || align=right | 1.9 km || 
|-id=104 bgcolor=#d6d6d6
| 326104 ||  || — || August 12, 2007 || 7300 Observatory || W. K. Y. Yeung || 3:2 || align=right | 5.3 km || 
|-id=105 bgcolor=#E9E9E9
| 326105 ||  || — || August 8, 2004 || Socorro || LINEAR || — || align=right | 2.2 km || 
|-id=106 bgcolor=#d6d6d6
| 326106 ||  || — || November 23, 2009 || Mount Lemmon || Mount Lemmon Survey || 3:2 || align=right | 5.8 km || 
|-id=107 bgcolor=#d6d6d6
| 326107 ||  || — || March 24, 2006 || Mount Lemmon || Mount Lemmon Survey || — || align=right | 2.7 km || 
|-id=108 bgcolor=#d6d6d6
| 326108 ||  || — || September 24, 2009 || Kitt Peak || Spacewatch || — || align=right | 2.7 km || 
|-id=109 bgcolor=#d6d6d6
| 326109 ||  || — || February 28, 2006 || Mount Lemmon || Mount Lemmon Survey || CRO || align=right | 3.1 km || 
|-id=110 bgcolor=#d6d6d6
| 326110 ||  || — || October 8, 2008 || Kitt Peak || Spacewatch || 3:2 || align=right | 4.4 km || 
|-id=111 bgcolor=#E9E9E9
| 326111 ||  || — || May 9, 1994 || Kitt Peak || Spacewatch || — || align=right | 2.7 km || 
|-id=112 bgcolor=#C2FFFF
| 326112 ||  || — || September 7, 2000 || Kitt Peak || Spacewatch || L5 || align=right | 11 km || 
|-id=113 bgcolor=#FA8072
| 326113 ||  || — || October 15, 2001 || Palomar || NEAT || — || align=right data-sort-value="0.94" | 940 m || 
|-id=114 bgcolor=#E9E9E9
| 326114 ||  || — || January 28, 2004 || Socorro || LINEAR || — || align=right | 2.5 km || 
|-id=115 bgcolor=#E9E9E9
| 326115 ||  || — || October 10, 2002 || Kitt Peak || Spacewatch || — || align=right | 1.8 km || 
|-id=116 bgcolor=#d6d6d6
| 326116 ||  || — || December 31, 2005 || Kitt Peak || Spacewatch || — || align=right | 4.6 km || 
|-id=117 bgcolor=#d6d6d6
| 326117 ||  || — || October 19, 2003 || Kitt Peak || Spacewatch || 3:2 || align=right | 5.4 km || 
|-id=118 bgcolor=#d6d6d6
| 326118 ||  || — || December 12, 2006 || Catalina || CSS || EOS || align=right | 2.4 km || 
|-id=119 bgcolor=#C2FFFF
| 326119 ||  || — || April 23, 2004 || Kitt Peak || Spacewatch || L4 || align=right | 11 km || 
|-id=120 bgcolor=#d6d6d6
| 326120 ||  || — || September 1, 2005 || Palomar || NEAT || — || align=right | 4.3 km || 
|-id=121 bgcolor=#d6d6d6
| 326121 ||  || — || July 28, 2005 || Palomar || NEAT || — || align=right | 4.5 km || 
|-id=122 bgcolor=#E9E9E9
| 326122 ||  || — || January 5, 2000 || Kitt Peak || Spacewatch || — || align=right | 2.8 km || 
|-id=123 bgcolor=#C2FFFF
| 326123 ||  || — || September 18, 2009 || Kitt Peak || Spacewatch || L4 || align=right | 9.5 km || 
|-id=124 bgcolor=#fefefe
| 326124 ||  || — || December 1, 2003 || Kitt Peak || Spacewatch || NYS || align=right data-sort-value="0.69" | 690 m || 
|-id=125 bgcolor=#C2FFFF
| 326125 ||  || — || November 8, 2009 || Catalina || CSS || L4 || align=right | 14 km || 
|-id=126 bgcolor=#d6d6d6
| 326126 ||  || — || February 21, 2007 || Antares || ARO || — || align=right | 3.3 km || 
|-id=127 bgcolor=#C2FFFF
| 326127 ||  || — || October 1, 2009 || Mount Lemmon || Mount Lemmon Survey || L4 || align=right | 12 km || 
|-id=128 bgcolor=#d6d6d6
| 326128 ||  || — || March 14, 2007 || Kitt Peak || Spacewatch || — || align=right | 3.1 km || 
|-id=129 bgcolor=#d6d6d6
| 326129 ||  || — || December 4, 2005 || Mount Lemmon || Mount Lemmon Survey || HYG || align=right | 4.0 km || 
|-id=130 bgcolor=#E9E9E9
| 326130 ||  || — || September 28, 2006 || Catalina || CSS || — || align=right | 2.6 km || 
|-id=131 bgcolor=#d6d6d6
| 326131 ||  || — || March 2, 2001 || Anderson Mesa || LONEOS || — || align=right | 4.6 km || 
|-id=132 bgcolor=#fefefe
| 326132 ||  || — || February 2, 2005 || Catalina || CSS || V || align=right data-sort-value="0.89" | 890 m || 
|-id=133 bgcolor=#E9E9E9
| 326133 ||  || — || September 13, 2005 || Kitt Peak || Spacewatch || — || align=right | 2.4 km || 
|-id=134 bgcolor=#fefefe
| 326134 ||  || — || February 16, 2001 || Kitt Peak || Spacewatch || NYS || align=right data-sort-value="0.74" | 740 m || 
|-id=135 bgcolor=#C2FFFF
| 326135 ||  || — || October 1, 2008 || Catalina || CSS || L4 || align=right | 13 km || 
|-id=136 bgcolor=#d6d6d6
| 326136 ||  || — || December 4, 2005 || Anderson Mesa || LONEOS || — || align=right | 4.5 km || 
|-id=137 bgcolor=#d6d6d6
| 326137 ||  || — || December 22, 2000 || Kitt Peak || Spacewatch || — || align=right | 4.2 km || 
|-id=138 bgcolor=#d6d6d6
| 326138 ||  || — || September 13, 2004 || Palomar || NEAT || — || align=right | 4.2 km || 
|-id=139 bgcolor=#E9E9E9
| 326139 ||  || — || October 20, 2006 || Mount Lemmon || Mount Lemmon Survey || DOR || align=right | 3.0 km || 
|-id=140 bgcolor=#E9E9E9
| 326140 ||  || — || June 30, 2005 || Kitt Peak || Spacewatch || PAD || align=right | 1.8 km || 
|-id=141 bgcolor=#fefefe
| 326141 ||  || — || January 5, 2002 || Kitt Peak || Spacewatch || — || align=right data-sort-value="0.75" | 750 m || 
|-id=142 bgcolor=#d6d6d6
| 326142 ||  || — || October 14, 2004 || Anderson Mesa || LONEOS || — || align=right | 4.6 km || 
|-id=143 bgcolor=#d6d6d6
| 326143 ||  || — || December 24, 2005 || Kitt Peak || Spacewatch || THM || align=right | 2.1 km || 
|-id=144 bgcolor=#fefefe
| 326144 ||  || — || September 6, 1996 || Kitt Peak || Spacewatch || FLO || align=right data-sort-value="0.77" | 770 m || 
|-id=145 bgcolor=#fefefe
| 326145 ||  || — || August 8, 1999 || Kitt Peak || Spacewatch || — || align=right | 1.1 km || 
|-id=146 bgcolor=#fefefe
| 326146 ||  || — || October 10, 2002 || Apache Point || SDSS || NYS || align=right data-sort-value="0.82" | 820 m || 
|-id=147 bgcolor=#fefefe
| 326147 ||  || — || April 6, 1995 || Kitt Peak || Spacewatch || — || align=right data-sort-value="0.72" | 720 m || 
|-id=148 bgcolor=#E9E9E9
| 326148 ||  || — || January 11, 2003 || Kitt Peak || Spacewatch || — || align=right | 4.3 km || 
|-id=149 bgcolor=#d6d6d6
| 326149 ||  || — || February 20, 2001 || Kitt Peak || Spacewatch || — || align=right | 3.9 km || 
|-id=150 bgcolor=#E9E9E9
| 326150 ||  || — || January 18, 2008 || Mount Lemmon || Mount Lemmon Survey || ADE || align=right | 2.4 km || 
|-id=151 bgcolor=#fefefe
| 326151 ||  || — || July 18, 2006 || Mount Lemmon || Mount Lemmon Survey || V || align=right data-sort-value="0.80" | 800 m || 
|-id=152 bgcolor=#E9E9E9
| 326152 ||  || — || January 17, 1994 || Kitt Peak || Spacewatch || — || align=right | 2.5 km || 
|-id=153 bgcolor=#C2FFFF
| 326153 ||  || — || January 29, 2010 || WISE || WISE || L4 || align=right | 11 km || 
|-id=154 bgcolor=#fefefe
| 326154 ||  || — || November 8, 2007 || Kitt Peak || Spacewatch || MAS || align=right data-sort-value="0.62" | 620 m || 
|-id=155 bgcolor=#E9E9E9
| 326155 ||  || — || July 28, 2005 || Palomar || NEAT || — || align=right | 2.0 km || 
|-id=156 bgcolor=#d6d6d6
| 326156 ||  || — || December 24, 2005 || Kitt Peak || Spacewatch || — || align=right | 4.0 km || 
|-id=157 bgcolor=#d6d6d6
| 326157 ||  || — || March 10, 2002 || Kitt Peak || Spacewatch || — || align=right | 2.7 km || 
|-id=158 bgcolor=#fefefe
| 326158 ||  || — || October 2, 1999 || Kitt Peak || Spacewatch || — || align=right | 1.1 km || 
|-id=159 bgcolor=#d6d6d6
| 326159 ||  || — || February 19, 2001 || Socorro || LINEAR || MEL || align=right | 4.3 km || 
|-id=160 bgcolor=#d6d6d6
| 326160 ||  || — || July 5, 2003 || Kitt Peak || Spacewatch || EOS || align=right | 2.4 km || 
|-id=161 bgcolor=#d6d6d6
| 326161 ||  || — || March 11, 2007 || Kitt Peak || Spacewatch || — || align=right | 3.7 km || 
|-id=162 bgcolor=#E9E9E9
| 326162 ||  || — || January 26, 2003 || Anderson Mesa || LONEOS || AER || align=right | 1.7 km || 
|-id=163 bgcolor=#d6d6d6
| 326163 ||  || — || December 25, 2005 || Kitt Peak || Spacewatch || — || align=right | 2.8 km || 
|-id=164 bgcolor=#E9E9E9
| 326164 Miketoomey ||  ||  || May 24, 2001 || Cerro Tololo || L. H. Wasserman || — || align=right | 1.7 km || 
|-id=165 bgcolor=#fefefe
| 326165 ||  || — || February 20, 1998 || Caussols || ODAS || V || align=right data-sort-value="0.78" | 780 m || 
|-id=166 bgcolor=#fefefe
| 326166 ||  || — || November 19, 2003 || Catalina || CSS || V || align=right data-sort-value="0.83" | 830 m || 
|-id=167 bgcolor=#d6d6d6
| 326167 ||  || — || February 5, 2002 || Palomar || NEAT || EOS || align=right | 2.3 km || 
|-id=168 bgcolor=#E9E9E9
| 326168 ||  || — || February 9, 1999 || Kitt Peak || Spacewatch || — || align=right | 2.0 km || 
|-id=169 bgcolor=#d6d6d6
| 326169 ||  || — || January 9, 2002 || Socorro || LINEAR || 628 || align=right | 2.3 km || 
|-id=170 bgcolor=#fefefe
| 326170 ||  || — || March 9, 2005 || Socorro || LINEAR || — || align=right | 1.2 km || 
|-id=171 bgcolor=#d6d6d6
| 326171 ||  || — || March 26, 2001 || Kitt Peak || Spacewatch || HYG || align=right | 3.3 km || 
|-id=172 bgcolor=#E9E9E9
| 326172 ||  || — || March 5, 2008 || Mount Lemmon || Mount Lemmon Survey || — || align=right | 1.0 km || 
|-id=173 bgcolor=#d6d6d6
| 326173 ||  || — || February 14, 2001 || Kleť || Kleť Obs. || — || align=right | 3.9 km || 
|-id=174 bgcolor=#E9E9E9
| 326174 ||  || — || April 11, 2008 || Kitt Peak || Spacewatch || AGN || align=right | 1.3 km || 
|-id=175 bgcolor=#d6d6d6
| 326175 ||  || — || December 1, 2005 || Kitt Peak || Spacewatch || THM || align=right | 2.4 km || 
|-id=176 bgcolor=#d6d6d6
| 326176 ||  || — || November 25, 2006 || Kitt Peak || Spacewatch || URS || align=right | 5.7 km || 
|-id=177 bgcolor=#fefefe
| 326177 ||  || — || November 19, 2003 || Palomar || NEAT || V || align=right data-sort-value="0.83" | 830 m || 
|-id=178 bgcolor=#fefefe
| 326178 ||  || — || March 16, 2001 || Kitt Peak || Spacewatch || — || align=right data-sort-value="0.99" | 990 m || 
|-id=179 bgcolor=#d6d6d6
| 326179 ||  || — || December 12, 1999 || Kitt Peak || Spacewatch || THM || align=right | 2.7 km || 
|-id=180 bgcolor=#fefefe
| 326180 ||  || — || November 30, 2003 || Socorro || LINEAR || — || align=right | 1.3 km || 
|-id=181 bgcolor=#d6d6d6
| 326181 ||  || — || August 29, 2009 || Kitt Peak || Spacewatch || — || align=right | 3.6 km || 
|-id=182 bgcolor=#fefefe
| 326182 ||  || — || March 18, 2005 || Catalina || CSS || V || align=right data-sort-value="0.87" | 870 m || 
|-id=183 bgcolor=#E9E9E9
| 326183 ||  || — || August 30, 2005 || Kitt Peak || Spacewatch || — || align=right | 1.8 km || 
|-id=184 bgcolor=#fefefe
| 326184 ||  || — || November 16, 2003 || Kitt Peak || Spacewatch || — || align=right data-sort-value="0.85" | 850 m || 
|-id=185 bgcolor=#fefefe
| 326185 ||  || — || November 24, 2003 || Kitt Peak || Spacewatch || — || align=right data-sort-value="0.92" | 920 m || 
|-id=186 bgcolor=#fefefe
| 326186 ||  || — || February 24, 1998 || Kitt Peak || Spacewatch || — || align=right data-sort-value="0.76" | 760 m || 
|-id=187 bgcolor=#d6d6d6
| 326187 ||  || — || October 1, 2005 || Kitt Peak || Spacewatch || KAR || align=right | 1.00 km || 
|-id=188 bgcolor=#E9E9E9
| 326188 ||  || — || November 1, 2006 || Mount Lemmon || Mount Lemmon Survey || — || align=right | 1.3 km || 
|-id=189 bgcolor=#d6d6d6
| 326189 ||  || — || September 19, 2003 || Kitt Peak || Spacewatch || HYG || align=right | 2.8 km || 
|-id=190 bgcolor=#fefefe
| 326190 ||  || — || November 6, 1999 || Kitt Peak || Spacewatch || MAS || align=right | 1.0 km || 
|-id=191 bgcolor=#d6d6d6
| 326191 ||  || — || October 12, 2004 || Kitt Peak || Spacewatch || THM || align=right | 2.5 km || 
|-id=192 bgcolor=#d6d6d6
| 326192 ||  || — || February 8, 1995 || Kitt Peak || Spacewatch || — || align=right | 2.9 km || 
|-id=193 bgcolor=#E9E9E9
| 326193 ||  || — || January 27, 2003 || Socorro || LINEAR || — || align=right | 2.2 km || 
|-id=194 bgcolor=#d6d6d6
| 326194 ||  || — || January 10, 2006 || Mount Lemmon || Mount Lemmon Survey || — || align=right | 3.9 km || 
|-id=195 bgcolor=#fefefe
| 326195 ||  || — || September 17, 2006 || Kitt Peak || Spacewatch || V || align=right data-sort-value="0.65" | 650 m || 
|-id=196 bgcolor=#fefefe
| 326196 ||  || — || March 19, 2001 || Kitt Peak || Spacewatch || NYS || align=right data-sort-value="0.82" | 820 m || 
|-id=197 bgcolor=#E9E9E9
| 326197 ||  || — || March 29, 2004 || Kitt Peak || Spacewatch || — || align=right data-sort-value="0.91" | 910 m || 
|-id=198 bgcolor=#fefefe
| 326198 ||  || — || July 14, 2002 || Palomar || NEAT || V || align=right data-sort-value="0.72" | 720 m || 
|-id=199 bgcolor=#d6d6d6
| 326199 ||  || — || December 25, 2005 || Mount Lemmon || Mount Lemmon Survey || THM || align=right | 2.5 km || 
|-id=200 bgcolor=#E9E9E9
| 326200 ||  || — || April 25, 2008 || Kitt Peak || Spacewatch || HEN || align=right | 1.2 km || 
|}

326201–326300 

|-bgcolor=#E9E9E9
| 326201 ||  || — || February 29, 2004 || Kitt Peak || Spacewatch || — || align=right | 1.0 km || 
|-id=202 bgcolor=#E9E9E9
| 326202 ||  || — || February 7, 2003 || Anderson Mesa || LONEOS || GAL || align=right | 1.8 km || 
|-id=203 bgcolor=#fefefe
| 326203 ||  || — || March 8, 2005 || Kitt Peak || Spacewatch || V || align=right data-sort-value="0.78" | 780 m || 
|-id=204 bgcolor=#fefefe
| 326204 ||  || — || September 18, 2003 || Palomar || NEAT || V || align=right data-sort-value="0.78" | 780 m || 
|-id=205 bgcolor=#fefefe
| 326205 ||  || — || March 21, 2001 || Kitt Peak || Spacewatch || MAS || align=right data-sort-value="0.69" | 690 m || 
|-id=206 bgcolor=#d6d6d6
| 326206 ||  || — || December 21, 2005 || Kitt Peak || Spacewatch || — || align=right | 4.1 km || 
|-id=207 bgcolor=#d6d6d6
| 326207 ||  || — || December 5, 2005 || Kitt Peak || Spacewatch || — || align=right | 4.1 km || 
|-id=208 bgcolor=#d6d6d6
| 326208 ||  || — || August 25, 2004 || Kitt Peak || Spacewatch || EOS || align=right | 1.8 km || 
|-id=209 bgcolor=#fefefe
| 326209 ||  || — || October 13, 1999 || Kitt Peak || Spacewatch || — || align=right data-sort-value="0.91" | 910 m || 
|-id=210 bgcolor=#d6d6d6
| 326210 ||  || — || March 10, 2007 || Mount Lemmon || Mount Lemmon Survey || — || align=right | 3.3 km || 
|-id=211 bgcolor=#d6d6d6
| 326211 ||  || — || February 1, 2006 || Mount Lemmon || Mount Lemmon Survey || — || align=right | 3.0 km || 
|-id=212 bgcolor=#C2FFFF
| 326212 ||  || — || July 5, 2005 || Mount Lemmon || Mount Lemmon Survey || L4 || align=right | 9.8 km || 
|-id=213 bgcolor=#fefefe
| 326213 ||  || — || March 9, 2005 || Mount Lemmon || Mount Lemmon Survey || — || align=right data-sort-value="0.68" | 680 m || 
|-id=214 bgcolor=#E9E9E9
| 326214 ||  || — || January 26, 1998 || Kitt Peak || Spacewatch || HOF || align=right | 2.8 km || 
|-id=215 bgcolor=#E9E9E9
| 326215 ||  || — || August 25, 2000 || Cerro Tololo || M. W. Buie || AGN || align=right | 1.1 km || 
|-id=216 bgcolor=#d6d6d6
| 326216 ||  || — || February 10, 2002 || Socorro || LINEAR || — || align=right | 2.2 km || 
|-id=217 bgcolor=#d6d6d6
| 326217 ||  || — || November 29, 2005 || Kitt Peak || Spacewatch || — || align=right | 3.0 km || 
|-id=218 bgcolor=#fefefe
| 326218 ||  || — || April 18, 1998 || Kitt Peak || Spacewatch || — || align=right data-sort-value="0.83" | 830 m || 
|-id=219 bgcolor=#E9E9E9
| 326219 ||  || — || March 10, 2003 || Kitt Peak || Spacewatch || — || align=right | 2.0 km || 
|-id=220 bgcolor=#fefefe
| 326220 ||  || — || April 14, 2002 || Palomar || NEAT || — || align=right data-sort-value="0.82" | 820 m || 
|-id=221 bgcolor=#fefefe
| 326221 ||  || — || September 15, 2006 || Kitt Peak || Spacewatch || NYS || align=right data-sort-value="0.97" | 970 m || 
|-id=222 bgcolor=#d6d6d6
| 326222 ||  || — || April 14, 2007 || Kitt Peak || Spacewatch || — || align=right | 2.8 km || 
|-id=223 bgcolor=#E9E9E9
| 326223 ||  || — || June 25, 2000 || Kitt Peak || Spacewatch || — || align=right | 2.7 km || 
|-id=224 bgcolor=#E9E9E9
| 326224 ||  || — || October 25, 2005 || Kitt Peak || Spacewatch || — || align=right | 2.2 km || 
|-id=225 bgcolor=#fefefe
| 326225 ||  || — || April 26, 2006 || Kitt Peak || Spacewatch || — || align=right data-sort-value="0.67" | 670 m || 
|-id=226 bgcolor=#fefefe
| 326226 ||  || — || March 1, 2005 || Kitt Peak || Spacewatch || V || align=right data-sort-value="0.80" | 800 m || 
|-id=227 bgcolor=#d6d6d6
| 326227 ||  || — || September 23, 2005 || Kitt Peak || Spacewatch || CHA || align=right | 2.2 km || 
|-id=228 bgcolor=#E9E9E9
| 326228 ||  || — || October 3, 2006 || Mount Lemmon || Mount Lemmon Survey || — || align=right | 1.3 km || 
|-id=229 bgcolor=#fefefe
| 326229 ||  || — || August 24, 2003 || Palomar || NEAT || — || align=right | 2.6 km || 
|-id=230 bgcolor=#d6d6d6
| 326230 ||  || — || December 30, 2005 || Kitt Peak || Spacewatch || — || align=right | 3.2 km || 
|-id=231 bgcolor=#E9E9E9
| 326231 ||  || — || November 18, 1998 || Kitt Peak || Spacewatch || — || align=right | 1.0 km || 
|-id=232 bgcolor=#fefefe
| 326232 ||  || — || September 7, 1999 || Kitt Peak || Spacewatch || NYS || align=right data-sort-value="0.84" | 840 m || 
|-id=233 bgcolor=#d6d6d6
| 326233 ||  || — || February 7, 2002 || Socorro || LINEAR || — || align=right | 3.0 km || 
|-id=234 bgcolor=#d6d6d6
| 326234 ||  || — || April 2, 2006 || Mount Lemmon || Mount Lemmon Survey || — || align=right | 3.6 km || 
|-id=235 bgcolor=#d6d6d6
| 326235 ||  || — || August 26, 2003 || Cerro Tololo || M. W. Buie || — || align=right | 4.2 km || 
|-id=236 bgcolor=#fefefe
| 326236 ||  || — || January 9, 2005 || Catalina || CSS || — || align=right | 2.6 km || 
|-id=237 bgcolor=#d6d6d6
| 326237 ||  || — || September 19, 1998 || Apache Point || SDSS || — || align=right | 4.1 km || 
|-id=238 bgcolor=#fefefe
| 326238 ||  || — || March 9, 2005 || Kitt Peak || Spacewatch || — || align=right data-sort-value="0.80" | 800 m || 
|-id=239 bgcolor=#d6d6d6
| 326239 ||  || — || December 30, 2005 || Kitt Peak || Spacewatch || HYG || align=right | 3.3 km || 
|-id=240 bgcolor=#E9E9E9
| 326240 ||  || — || February 6, 2007 || Palomar || NEAT || DOR || align=right | 2.8 km || 
|-id=241 bgcolor=#E9E9E9
| 326241 ||  || — || March 27, 1995 || Kitt Peak || Spacewatch || — || align=right | 1.9 km || 
|-id=242 bgcolor=#E9E9E9
| 326242 ||  || — || April 26, 2000 || Kitt Peak || Spacewatch || fast? || align=right | 1.1 km || 
|-id=243 bgcolor=#E9E9E9
| 326243 ||  || — || July 3, 1995 || Kitt Peak || Spacewatch || — || align=right | 2.9 km || 
|-id=244 bgcolor=#d6d6d6
| 326244 ||  || — || February 1, 2006 || Mount Lemmon || Mount Lemmon Survey || — || align=right | 3.2 km || 
|-id=245 bgcolor=#E9E9E9
| 326245 ||  || — || March 30, 2008 || Kitt Peak || Spacewatch || — || align=right | 1.9 km || 
|-id=246 bgcolor=#E9E9E9
| 326246 ||  || — || October 1, 2005 || Kitt Peak || Spacewatch || AEO || align=right | 1.3 km || 
|-id=247 bgcolor=#fefefe
| 326247 ||  || — || March 11, 2005 || Kitt Peak || Spacewatch || NYS || align=right data-sort-value="0.80" | 800 m || 
|-id=248 bgcolor=#d6d6d6
| 326248 ||  || — || April 10, 2002 || Socorro || LINEAR || EOS || align=right | 2.7 km || 
|-id=249 bgcolor=#fefefe
| 326249 ||  || — || June 11, 2005 || Kitt Peak || Spacewatch || FLO || align=right data-sort-value="0.85" | 850 m || 
|-id=250 bgcolor=#fefefe
| 326250 ||  || — || January 19, 2001 || Kitt Peak || Spacewatch || — || align=right data-sort-value="0.78" | 780 m || 
|-id=251 bgcolor=#E9E9E9
| 326251 ||  || — || March 24, 2003 || Kitt Peak || Spacewatch || — || align=right | 2.6 km || 
|-id=252 bgcolor=#d6d6d6
| 326252 ||  || — || October 27, 2005 || Kitt Peak || Spacewatch || KOR || align=right | 1.4 km || 
|-id=253 bgcolor=#d6d6d6
| 326253 ||  || — || January 31, 2006 || Mount Lemmon || Mount Lemmon Survey || — || align=right | 3.0 km || 
|-id=254 bgcolor=#fefefe
| 326254 ||  || — || May 20, 2005 || Mount Lemmon || Mount Lemmon Survey || ERI || align=right | 1.5 km || 
|-id=255 bgcolor=#fefefe
| 326255 ||  || — || September 26, 2006 || Kitt Peak || Spacewatch || — || align=right data-sort-value="0.96" | 960 m || 
|-id=256 bgcolor=#E9E9E9
| 326256 ||  || — || August 8, 2004 || Socorro || LINEAR || HOF || align=right | 3.3 km || 
|-id=257 bgcolor=#E9E9E9
| 326257 ||  || — || March 7, 2003 || Socorro || LINEAR || WIT || align=right | 1.4 km || 
|-id=258 bgcolor=#d6d6d6
| 326258 ||  || — || January 24, 2006 || Anderson Mesa || LONEOS || VER || align=right | 4.0 km || 
|-id=259 bgcolor=#E9E9E9
| 326259 ||  || — || November 24, 2006 || Kitt Peak || Spacewatch || — || align=right | 1.5 km || 
|-id=260 bgcolor=#d6d6d6
| 326260 ||  || — || October 31, 2005 || Mount Lemmon || Mount Lemmon Survey || KAR || align=right | 1.4 km || 
|-id=261 bgcolor=#d6d6d6
| 326261 ||  || — || May 25, 2006 || Mount Lemmon || Mount Lemmon Survey || EUP || align=right | 4.6 km || 
|-id=262 bgcolor=#d6d6d6
| 326262 ||  || — || November 9, 1999 || Kitt Peak || Spacewatch || THM || align=right | 2.1 km || 
|-id=263 bgcolor=#d6d6d6
| 326263 || 2741 P-L || — || September 24, 1960 || Palomar || PLS || — || align=right | 4.4 km || 
|-id=264 bgcolor=#fefefe
| 326264 ||  || — || October 16, 1977 || Palomar || PLS || MAS || align=right data-sort-value="0.73" | 730 m || 
|-id=265 bgcolor=#fefefe
| 326265 ||  || — || October 16, 1977 || Palomar || PLS || EUT || align=right data-sort-value="0.79" | 790 m || 
|-id=266 bgcolor=#E9E9E9
| 326266 ||  || — || October 16, 1977 || Palomar || PLS || — || align=right | 2.8 km || 
|-id=267 bgcolor=#d6d6d6
| 326267 ||  || — || January 21, 1993 || Kitt Peak || Spacewatch || — || align=right | 4.8 km || 
|-id=268 bgcolor=#FA8072
| 326268 ||  || — || October 15, 1993 || Kitt Peak || Spacewatch || — || align=right data-sort-value="0.70" | 700 m || 
|-id=269 bgcolor=#fefefe
| 326269 ||  || — || June 3, 1994 || La Silla || H. Debehogne || ERI || align=right | 1.7 km || 
|-id=270 bgcolor=#fefefe
| 326270 ||  || — || September 28, 1994 || Kitt Peak || Spacewatch || — || align=right data-sort-value="0.75" | 750 m || 
|-id=271 bgcolor=#d6d6d6
| 326271 ||  || — || January 31, 1995 || Kitt Peak || Spacewatch || — || align=right | 4.1 km || 
|-id=272 bgcolor=#E9E9E9
| 326272 ||  || — || January 31, 1995 || Kitt Peak || Spacewatch || — || align=right | 1.2 km || 
|-id=273 bgcolor=#d6d6d6
| 326273 ||  || — || February 24, 1995 || Kitt Peak || Spacewatch || HYG || align=right | 3.4 km || 
|-id=274 bgcolor=#fefefe
| 326274 ||  || — || August 27, 1995 || Kitt Peak || Spacewatch || V || align=right data-sort-value="0.57" | 570 m || 
|-id=275 bgcolor=#fefefe
| 326275 ||  || — || September 22, 1995 || Kitt Peak || Spacewatch || — || align=right data-sort-value="0.92" | 920 m || 
|-id=276 bgcolor=#fefefe
| 326276 ||  || — || September 25, 1995 || Kitt Peak || Spacewatch || — || align=right data-sort-value="0.89" | 890 m || 
|-id=277 bgcolor=#E9E9E9
| 326277 ||  || — || November 19, 1995 || Kitt Peak || Spacewatch || HOF || align=right | 2.8 km || 
|-id=278 bgcolor=#fefefe
| 326278 ||  || — || April 13, 1996 || Kitt Peak || Spacewatch || — || align=right data-sort-value="0.71" | 710 m || 
|-id=279 bgcolor=#E9E9E9
| 326279 ||  || — || September 5, 1996 || Kitt Peak || Spacewatch || EUN || align=right | 1.5 km || 
|-id=280 bgcolor=#E9E9E9
| 326280 ||  || — || October 7, 1996 || Kitt Peak || Spacewatch || MRX || align=right | 1.3 km || 
|-id=281 bgcolor=#fefefe
| 326281 ||  || — || November 4, 1996 || Kitt Peak || Spacewatch || — || align=right data-sort-value="0.83" | 830 m || 
|-id=282 bgcolor=#E9E9E9
| 326282 ||  || — || November 10, 1996 || Kitt Peak || Spacewatch || MRX || align=right | 1.2 km || 
|-id=283 bgcolor=#fefefe
| 326283 ||  || — || November 10, 1996 || Kitt Peak || Spacewatch || V || align=right data-sort-value="0.62" | 620 m || 
|-id=284 bgcolor=#fefefe
| 326284 ||  || — || December 4, 1996 || Kitt Peak || Spacewatch || — || align=right data-sort-value="0.66" | 660 m || 
|-id=285 bgcolor=#fefefe
| 326285 ||  || — || December 1, 1996 || Kitt Peak || Spacewatch || V || align=right data-sort-value="0.81" | 810 m || 
|-id=286 bgcolor=#E9E9E9
| 326286 ||  || — || September 30, 1997 || Kitt Peak || Spacewatch || — || align=right | 1.1 km || 
|-id=287 bgcolor=#E9E9E9
| 326287 ||  || — || October 23, 1997 || Kitt Peak || Spacewatch || — || align=right | 1.3 km || 
|-id=288 bgcolor=#d6d6d6
| 326288 ||  || — || October 30, 1997 || Prescott || P. G. Comba || — || align=right | 4.7 km || 
|-id=289 bgcolor=#d6d6d6
| 326289 ||  || — || November 23, 1997 || Kitt Peak || Spacewatch || HYG || align=right | 3.2 km || 
|-id=290 bgcolor=#FFC2E0
| 326290 Akhenaten ||  ||  || April 21, 1998 || Goodricke-Pigott || R. A. Tucker || ATEPHA || align=right data-sort-value="0.16" | 160 m || 
|-id=291 bgcolor=#FFC2E0
| 326291 ||  || — || April 21, 1998 || Socorro || LINEAR || AMO || align=right data-sort-value="0.56" | 560 m || 
|-id=292 bgcolor=#E9E9E9
| 326292 ||  || — || April 19, 1998 || Kitt Peak || Spacewatch || — || align=right | 3.2 km || 
|-id=293 bgcolor=#fefefe
| 326293 ||  || — || June 19, 1998 || Kitt Peak || Spacewatch || V || align=right data-sort-value="0.73" | 730 m || 
|-id=294 bgcolor=#fefefe
| 326294 ||  || — || September 14, 1998 || Socorro || LINEAR || — || align=right | 1.1 km || 
|-id=295 bgcolor=#d6d6d6
| 326295 ||  || — || September 14, 1998 || Socorro || LINEAR || — || align=right | 3.6 km || 
|-id=296 bgcolor=#fefefe
| 326296 ||  || — || September 21, 1998 || Kitt Peak || Spacewatch || NYS || align=right data-sort-value="0.87" | 870 m || 
|-id=297 bgcolor=#fefefe
| 326297 ||  || — || September 27, 1998 || Kitt Peak || Spacewatch || NYS || align=right data-sort-value="0.74" | 740 m || 
|-id=298 bgcolor=#fefefe
| 326298 ||  || — || September 17, 1998 || Anderson Mesa || LONEOS || ERI || align=right | 2.1 km || 
|-id=299 bgcolor=#d6d6d6
| 326299 ||  || — || September 19, 1998 || Apache Point || SDSS || — || align=right | 2.6 km || 
|-id=300 bgcolor=#d6d6d6
| 326300 ||  || — || October 14, 1998 || Kitt Peak || Spacewatch || — || align=right | 2.6 km || 
|}

326301–326400 

|-bgcolor=#fefefe
| 326301 ||  || — || October 14, 1998 || Kitt Peak || Spacewatch || — || align=right | 1.2 km || 
|-id=302 bgcolor=#FFC2E0
| 326302 ||  || — || November 10, 1998 || Socorro || LINEAR || APO || align=right data-sort-value="0.28" | 280 m || 
|-id=303 bgcolor=#fefefe
| 326303 ||  || — || November 14, 1998 || Socorro || LINEAR || — || align=right | 1.5 km || 
|-id=304 bgcolor=#d6d6d6
| 326304 ||  || — || November 16, 1998 || Kitt Peak || Spacewatch || — || align=right | 2.8 km || 
|-id=305 bgcolor=#fefefe
| 326305 ||  || — || November 23, 1998 || Kitt Peak || Spacewatch || NYS || align=right data-sort-value="0.92" | 920 m || 
|-id=306 bgcolor=#FA8072
| 326306 ||  || — || December 12, 1998 || Socorro || LINEAR || — || align=right | 1.8 km || 
|-id=307 bgcolor=#fefefe
| 326307 ||  || — || December 8, 1998 || Caussols || ODAS || — || align=right | 1.4 km || 
|-id=308 bgcolor=#E9E9E9
| 326308 ||  || — || March 20, 1999 || Apache Point || SDSS || — || align=right | 1.7 km || 
|-id=309 bgcolor=#fefefe
| 326309 ||  || — || September 4, 1999 || Kitt Peak || Spacewatch || NYS || align=right data-sort-value="0.70" | 700 m || 
|-id=310 bgcolor=#fefefe
| 326310 ||  || — || September 9, 1999 || Socorro || LINEAR || — || align=right data-sort-value="0.83" | 830 m || 
|-id=311 bgcolor=#E9E9E9
| 326311 ||  || — || September 9, 1999 || Socorro || LINEAR || — || align=right | 3.3 km || 
|-id=312 bgcolor=#fefefe
| 326312 ||  || — || October 9, 1999 || Kitt Peak || Spacewatch || V || align=right data-sort-value="0.82" | 820 m || 
|-id=313 bgcolor=#E9E9E9
| 326313 ||  || — || October 6, 1999 || Socorro || LINEAR || DOR || align=right | 3.3 km || 
|-id=314 bgcolor=#fefefe
| 326314 ||  || — || October 13, 1999 || Socorro || LINEAR || — || align=right | 1.1 km || 
|-id=315 bgcolor=#fefefe
| 326315 ||  || — || October 31, 1999 || Kitt Peak || Spacewatch || — || align=right data-sort-value="0.86" | 860 m || 
|-id=316 bgcolor=#d6d6d6
| 326316 ||  || — || October 31, 1999 || Kitt Peak || Spacewatch || — || align=right | 3.7 km || 
|-id=317 bgcolor=#FA8072
| 326317 ||  || — || November 13, 1999 || Eskridge || G. Hug, G. Bell || — || align=right | 3.2 km || 
|-id=318 bgcolor=#FA8072
| 326318 ||  || — || November 5, 1999 || Catalina || CSS || — || align=right | 3.6 km || 
|-id=319 bgcolor=#fefefe
| 326319 ||  || — || November 10, 1999 || Kitt Peak || Spacewatch || FLO || align=right data-sort-value="0.69" | 690 m || 
|-id=320 bgcolor=#d6d6d6
| 326320 ||  || — || November 9, 1999 || Kitt Peak || Spacewatch || — || align=right | 2.6 km || 
|-id=321 bgcolor=#FA8072
| 326321 ||  || — || November 7, 1999 || Socorro || LINEAR || PHO || align=right | 1.3 km || 
|-id=322 bgcolor=#fefefe
| 326322 ||  || — || November 12, 1999 || Socorro || LINEAR || MAS || align=right data-sort-value="0.87" | 870 m || 
|-id=323 bgcolor=#d6d6d6
| 326323 ||  || — || November 13, 1999 || Catalina || CSS || — || align=right | 4.0 km || 
|-id=324 bgcolor=#fefefe
| 326324 ||  || — || December 7, 1999 || Socorro || LINEAR || — || align=right data-sort-value="0.86" | 860 m || 
|-id=325 bgcolor=#d6d6d6
| 326325 ||  || — || December 13, 1999 || Kitt Peak || Spacewatch || — || align=right | 3.2 km || 
|-id=326 bgcolor=#d6d6d6
| 326326 ||  || — || December 13, 1999 || Kitt Peak || Spacewatch || — || align=right | 4.1 km || 
|-id=327 bgcolor=#d6d6d6
| 326327 ||  || — || December 27, 1999 || Kitt Peak || Spacewatch || — || align=right | 3.9 km || 
|-id=328 bgcolor=#d6d6d6
| 326328 ||  || — || January 26, 2000 || Kitt Peak || Spacewatch || — || align=right | 3.8 km || 
|-id=329 bgcolor=#d6d6d6
| 326329 ||  || — || March 3, 2000 || Kitt Peak || Spacewatch || — || align=right | 4.0 km || 
|-id=330 bgcolor=#fefefe
| 326330 ||  || — || March 10, 2000 || Kitt Peak || Spacewatch || NYS || align=right data-sort-value="0.90" | 900 m || 
|-id=331 bgcolor=#fefefe
| 326331 ||  || — || March 10, 2000 || Kitt Peak || Spacewatch || — || align=right | 1.3 km || 
|-id=332 bgcolor=#FFC2E0
| 326332 ||  || — || April 6, 2000 || Socorro || LINEAR || AMO +1kmcritical || align=right data-sort-value="0.93" | 930 m || 
|-id=333 bgcolor=#FA8072
| 326333 ||  || — || May 27, 2000 || Socorro || LINEAR || — || align=right | 1.5 km || 
|-id=334 bgcolor=#E9E9E9
| 326334 ||  || — || August 25, 2000 || Socorro || LINEAR || — || align=right | 1.2 km || 
|-id=335 bgcolor=#E9E9E9
| 326335 ||  || — || August 28, 2000 || Socorro || LINEAR || EUN || align=right | 1.5 km || 
|-id=336 bgcolor=#E9E9E9
| 326336 ||  || — || August 26, 2000 || Socorro || LINEAR || ADE || align=right | 3.0 km || 
|-id=337 bgcolor=#E9E9E9
| 326337 ||  || — || August 31, 2000 || Socorro || LINEAR || GER || align=right | 2.1 km || 
|-id=338 bgcolor=#E9E9E9
| 326338 ||  || — || August 29, 2000 || Socorro || LINEAR || RAF || align=right | 1.5 km || 
|-id=339 bgcolor=#E9E9E9
| 326339 ||  || — || September 7, 2000 || Kitt Peak || Spacewatch || WIT || align=right | 1.0 km || 
|-id=340 bgcolor=#E9E9E9
| 326340 ||  || — || September 9, 2000 || Anderson Mesa || LONEOS || BAR || align=right | 1.5 km || 
|-id=341 bgcolor=#E9E9E9
| 326341 ||  || — || September 5, 2000 || Anderson Mesa || LONEOS || JUN || align=right | 1.3 km || 
|-id=342 bgcolor=#E9E9E9
| 326342 ||  || — || September 3, 2000 || Apache Point || SDSS || — || align=right | 1.4 km || 
|-id=343 bgcolor=#E9E9E9
| 326343 ||  || — || September 21, 2000 || Socorro || LINEAR || — || align=right | 1.8 km || 
|-id=344 bgcolor=#E9E9E9
| 326344 ||  || — || September 23, 2000 || Socorro || LINEAR || ADE || align=right | 2.7 km || 
|-id=345 bgcolor=#E9E9E9
| 326345 ||  || — || September 24, 2000 || Socorro || LINEAR || — || align=right | 2.2 km || 
|-id=346 bgcolor=#E9E9E9
| 326346 ||  || — || September 24, 2000 || Socorro || LINEAR || — || align=right | 2.4 km || 
|-id=347 bgcolor=#E9E9E9
| 326347 ||  || — || September 24, 2000 || Socorro || LINEAR || — || align=right | 2.6 km || 
|-id=348 bgcolor=#fefefe
| 326348 ||  || — || September 23, 2000 || Socorro || LINEAR || — || align=right | 1.3 km || 
|-id=349 bgcolor=#E9E9E9
| 326349 ||  || — || September 24, 2000 || Socorro || LINEAR || EUN || align=right | 1.5 km || 
|-id=350 bgcolor=#FA8072
| 326350 ||  || — || September 26, 2000 || Socorro || LINEAR || — || align=right data-sort-value="0.89" | 890 m || 
|-id=351 bgcolor=#fefefe
| 326351 ||  || — || September 24, 2000 || Socorro || LINEAR || FLO || align=right data-sort-value="0.81" | 810 m || 
|-id=352 bgcolor=#E9E9E9
| 326352 ||  || — || September 25, 2000 || Socorro || LINEAR || — || align=right | 3.2 km || 
|-id=353 bgcolor=#E9E9E9
| 326353 ||  || — || September 27, 2000 || Socorro || LINEAR || MAR || align=right | 1.5 km || 
|-id=354 bgcolor=#FFC2E0
| 326354 ||  || — || September 30, 2000 || Mauna Kea || D. J. Tholen, R. J. Whiteley || APO || align=right data-sort-value="0.10" | 100 m || 
|-id=355 bgcolor=#E9E9E9
| 326355 ||  || — || September 26, 2000 || Haleakala || NEAT || — || align=right | 2.0 km || 
|-id=356 bgcolor=#E9E9E9
| 326356 ||  || — || September 23, 2000 || Anderson Mesa || LONEOS || — || align=right | 2.0 km || 
|-id=357 bgcolor=#E9E9E9
| 326357 ||  || — || September 22, 2000 || Socorro || LINEAR || EUN || align=right | 1.6 km || 
|-id=358 bgcolor=#E9E9E9
| 326358 ||  || — || October 6, 2000 || Anderson Mesa || LONEOS || — || align=right | 2.8 km || 
|-id=359 bgcolor=#E9E9E9
| 326359 ||  || — || October 1, 2000 || Anderson Mesa || LONEOS || GEF || align=right | 1.6 km || 
|-id=360 bgcolor=#E9E9E9
| 326360 ||  || — || October 1, 2000 || Socorro || LINEAR || JUN || align=right | 1.4 km || 
|-id=361 bgcolor=#fefefe
| 326361 ||  || — || October 25, 2000 || Kitt Peak || Spacewatch || FLO || align=right data-sort-value="0.71" | 710 m || 
|-id=362 bgcolor=#E9E9E9
| 326362 ||  || — || October 29, 2000 || Socorro || LINEAR || — || align=right | 3.9 km || 
|-id=363 bgcolor=#E9E9E9
| 326363 ||  || — || October 25, 2000 || Socorro || LINEAR || INO || align=right | 1.4 km || 
|-id=364 bgcolor=#FA8072
| 326364 ||  || — || November 1, 2000 || Socorro || LINEAR || — || align=right | 1.4 km || 
|-id=365 bgcolor=#E9E9E9
| 326365 ||  || — || November 1, 2000 || Socorro || LINEAR || GEF || align=right | 1.7 km || 
|-id=366 bgcolor=#E9E9E9
| 326366 ||  || — || November 20, 2000 || Socorro || LINEAR || slow || align=right | 2.5 km || 
|-id=367 bgcolor=#E9E9E9
| 326367 ||  || — || November 20, 2000 || Socorro || LINEAR || — || align=right | 3.0 km || 
|-id=368 bgcolor=#E9E9E9
| 326368 ||  || — || November 27, 2000 || Haleakala || NEAT || — || align=right | 3.2 km || 
|-id=369 bgcolor=#fefefe
| 326369 ||  || — || November 20, 2000 || Socorro || LINEAR || — || align=right data-sort-value="0.90" | 900 m || 
|-id=370 bgcolor=#fefefe
| 326370 ||  || — || November 20, 2000 || Socorro || LINEAR || FLO || align=right data-sort-value="0.89" | 890 m || 
|-id=371 bgcolor=#d6d6d6
| 326371 ||  || — || November 20, 2000 || Socorro || LINEAR || — || align=right | 2.9 km || 
|-id=372 bgcolor=#fefefe
| 326372 ||  || — || November 30, 2000 || Anderson Mesa || LONEOS || — || align=right data-sort-value="0.93" | 930 m || 
|-id=373 bgcolor=#fefefe
| 326373 ||  || — || December 4, 2000 || Socorro || LINEAR || PHO || align=right | 1.5 km || 
|-id=374 bgcolor=#E9E9E9
| 326374 ||  || — || December 4, 2000 || Prescott || P. G. Comba || GEF || align=right | 1.8 km || 
|-id=375 bgcolor=#fefefe
| 326375 ||  || — || January 17, 2001 || Haleakala || NEAT || — || align=right | 1.0 km || 
|-id=376 bgcolor=#fefefe
| 326376 ||  || — || February 1, 2001 || Socorro || LINEAR || — || align=right | 1.1 km || 
|-id=377 bgcolor=#d6d6d6
| 326377 ||  || — || February 17, 2001 || Socorro || LINEAR || — || align=right | 2.8 km || 
|-id=378 bgcolor=#d6d6d6
| 326378 ||  || — || February 19, 2001 || Haleakala || NEAT || — || align=right | 4.8 km || 
|-id=379 bgcolor=#d6d6d6
| 326379 ||  || — || March 24, 2001 || Haleakala || NEAT || — || align=right | 4.0 km || 
|-id=380 bgcolor=#d6d6d6
| 326380 ||  || — || March 19, 2001 || Socorro || LINEAR || — || align=right | 4.3 km || 
|-id=381 bgcolor=#fefefe
| 326381 ||  || — || March 16, 2001 || Socorro || LINEAR || — || align=right | 1.2 km || 
|-id=382 bgcolor=#d6d6d6
| 326382 ||  || — || April 24, 2001 || Kitt Peak || Spacewatch || MEL || align=right | 3.9 km || 
|-id=383 bgcolor=#fefefe
| 326383 ||  || — || April 27, 2001 || Socorro || LINEAR || H || align=right data-sort-value="0.72" | 720 m || 
|-id=384 bgcolor=#fefefe
| 326384 ||  || — || April 17, 2001 || Anderson Mesa || LONEOS || — || align=right data-sort-value="0.99" | 990 m || 
|-id=385 bgcolor=#fefefe
| 326385 ||  || — || May 25, 2001 || Socorro || LINEAR || — || align=right | 1.1 km || 
|-id=386 bgcolor=#FFC2E0
| 326386 ||  || — || July 20, 2001 || Socorro || LINEAR || APO || align=right data-sort-value="0.71" | 710 m || 
|-id=387 bgcolor=#E9E9E9
| 326387 ||  || — || July 16, 2001 || Anderson Mesa || LONEOS || — || align=right | 1.7 km || 
|-id=388 bgcolor=#FFC2E0
| 326388 ||  || — || August 19, 2001 || Socorro || LINEAR || APO || align=right | 1.3 km || 
|-id=389 bgcolor=#E9E9E9
| 326389 ||  || — || August 17, 2001 || Socorro || LINEAR || GER || align=right | 1.9 km || 
|-id=390 bgcolor=#E9E9E9
| 326390 ||  || — || August 21, 2001 || Socorro || LINEAR || — || align=right | 1.9 km || 
|-id=391 bgcolor=#E9E9E9
| 326391 ||  || — || August 23, 2001 || Anderson Mesa || LONEOS || — || align=right | 2.0 km || 
|-id=392 bgcolor=#E9E9E9
| 326392 ||  || — || August 23, 2001 || Anderson Mesa || LONEOS || RAF || align=right | 1.1 km || 
|-id=393 bgcolor=#E9E9E9
| 326393 ||  || — || August 20, 2001 || Palomar || NEAT || BRU || align=right | 3.2 km || 
|-id=394 bgcolor=#E9E9E9
| 326394 ||  || — || August 17, 2001 || Palomar || NEAT || — || align=right | 1.2 km || 
|-id=395 bgcolor=#E9E9E9
| 326395 ||  || — || September 7, 2001 || Socorro || LINEAR || ADE || align=right | 2.4 km || 
|-id=396 bgcolor=#E9E9E9
| 326396 ||  || — || September 8, 2001 || Socorro || LINEAR || — || align=right | 3.3 km || 
|-id=397 bgcolor=#FA8072
| 326397 ||  || — || September 11, 2001 || Anderson Mesa || LONEOS || — || align=right | 2.7 km || 
|-id=398 bgcolor=#E9E9E9
| 326398 ||  || — || September 12, 2001 || Kitt Peak || Spacewatch || — || align=right | 1.3 km || 
|-id=399 bgcolor=#E9E9E9
| 326399 ||  || — || September 12, 2001 || Socorro || LINEAR || — || align=right | 1.2 km || 
|-id=400 bgcolor=#E9E9E9
| 326400 ||  || — || September 17, 2001 || Socorro || LINEAR || CLO || align=right | 1.6 km || 
|}

326401–326500 

|-bgcolor=#E9E9E9
| 326401 ||  || — || September 20, 2001 || Socorro || LINEAR || — || align=right | 1.1 km || 
|-id=402 bgcolor=#d6d6d6
| 326402 ||  || — || September 16, 2001 || Socorro || LINEAR || — || align=right | 2.8 km || 
|-id=403 bgcolor=#E9E9E9
| 326403 ||  || — || September 16, 2001 || Socorro || LINEAR || — || align=right | 1.1 km || 
|-id=404 bgcolor=#E9E9E9
| 326404 ||  || — || September 16, 2001 || Socorro || LINEAR || — || align=right | 1.2 km || 
|-id=405 bgcolor=#E9E9E9
| 326405 ||  || — || September 16, 2001 || Socorro || LINEAR || MIS || align=right | 2.6 km || 
|-id=406 bgcolor=#E9E9E9
| 326406 ||  || — || September 16, 2001 || Socorro || LINEAR || — || align=right | 2.4 km || 
|-id=407 bgcolor=#E9E9E9
| 326407 ||  || — || September 16, 2001 || Socorro || LINEAR || — || align=right | 1.4 km || 
|-id=408 bgcolor=#E9E9E9
| 326408 ||  || — || September 16, 2001 || Socorro || LINEAR || — || align=right | 1.7 km || 
|-id=409 bgcolor=#d6d6d6
| 326409 ||  || — || September 19, 2001 || Socorro || LINEAR || 7:4 || align=right | 3.9 km || 
|-id=410 bgcolor=#E9E9E9
| 326410 ||  || — || September 19, 2001 || Socorro || LINEAR || EUN || align=right | 1.3 km || 
|-id=411 bgcolor=#E9E9E9
| 326411 ||  || — || September 19, 2001 || Socorro || LINEAR || — || align=right | 1.2 km || 
|-id=412 bgcolor=#E9E9E9
| 326412 ||  || — || September 19, 2001 || Socorro || LINEAR || — || align=right | 1.2 km || 
|-id=413 bgcolor=#E9E9E9
| 326413 ||  || — || September 25, 2001 || Socorro || LINEAR || — || align=right | 1.7 km || 
|-id=414 bgcolor=#E9E9E9
| 326414 ||  || — || September 17, 2001 || Socorro || LINEAR || BRU || align=right | 3.0 km || 
|-id=415 bgcolor=#E9E9E9
| 326415 ||  || — || September 18, 2001 || Anderson Mesa || LONEOS || — || align=right | 1.4 km || 
|-id=416 bgcolor=#E9E9E9
| 326416 ||  || — || September 21, 2001 || Kitt Peak || Spacewatch || JUN || align=right | 1.1 km || 
|-id=417 bgcolor=#E9E9E9
| 326417 ||  || — || October 13, 2001 || Socorro || LINEAR || — || align=right | 2.3 km || 
|-id=418 bgcolor=#E9E9E9
| 326418 ||  || — || October 14, 2001 || Socorro || LINEAR || ADE || align=right | 2.2 km || 
|-id=419 bgcolor=#E9E9E9
| 326419 ||  || — || October 14, 2001 || Socorro || LINEAR || — || align=right | 2.4 km || 
|-id=420 bgcolor=#E9E9E9
| 326420 ||  || — || October 14, 2001 || Socorro || LINEAR || — || align=right | 2.0 km || 
|-id=421 bgcolor=#E9E9E9
| 326421 ||  || — || October 13, 2001 || Socorro || LINEAR || — || align=right | 1.9 km || 
|-id=422 bgcolor=#E9E9E9
| 326422 ||  || — || October 14, 2001 || Socorro || LINEAR || — || align=right | 1.1 km || 
|-id=423 bgcolor=#E9E9E9
| 326423 ||  || — || October 14, 2001 || Socorro || LINEAR || — || align=right | 2.7 km || 
|-id=424 bgcolor=#E9E9E9
| 326424 ||  || — || October 15, 2001 || Kitt Peak || Spacewatch || — || align=right | 1.1 km || 
|-id=425 bgcolor=#E9E9E9
| 326425 ||  || — || October 13, 2001 || Kitt Peak || Spacewatch || — || align=right | 1.3 km || 
|-id=426 bgcolor=#E9E9E9
| 326426 ||  || — || October 14, 2001 || Kitt Peak || Spacewatch || — || align=right | 1.5 km || 
|-id=427 bgcolor=#E9E9E9
| 326427 ||  || — || October 11, 2001 || Palomar || NEAT || — || align=right | 1.3 km || 
|-id=428 bgcolor=#E9E9E9
| 326428 ||  || — || October 14, 2001 || Socorro || LINEAR || — || align=right | 2.1 km || 
|-id=429 bgcolor=#E9E9E9
| 326429 ||  || — || October 11, 2001 || Palomar || NEAT || — || align=right | 1.5 km || 
|-id=430 bgcolor=#E9E9E9
| 326430 ||  || — || October 14, 2001 || Socorro || LINEAR || — || align=right | 2.4 km || 
|-id=431 bgcolor=#E9E9E9
| 326431 ||  || — || October 14, 2001 || Apache Point || SDSS || MAR || align=right | 1.4 km || 
|-id=432 bgcolor=#E9E9E9
| 326432 ||  || — || October 16, 2001 || Socorro || LINEAR || — || align=right | 2.3 km || 
|-id=433 bgcolor=#E9E9E9
| 326433 ||  || — || October 17, 2001 || Socorro || LINEAR || — || align=right | 2.0 km || 
|-id=434 bgcolor=#E9E9E9
| 326434 ||  || — || October 19, 2001 || Socorro || LINEAR || — || align=right | 1.2 km || 
|-id=435 bgcolor=#E9E9E9
| 326435 ||  || — || October 17, 2001 || Socorro || LINEAR || — || align=right | 1.1 km || 
|-id=436 bgcolor=#E9E9E9
| 326436 ||  || — || October 22, 2001 || Socorro || LINEAR || PAL || align=right | 2.2 km || 
|-id=437 bgcolor=#E9E9E9
| 326437 ||  || — || October 23, 2001 || Socorro || LINEAR || — || align=right | 2.0 km || 
|-id=438 bgcolor=#E9E9E9
| 326438 ||  || — || October 26, 2001 || Haleakala || NEAT || BRU || align=right | 3.7 km || 
|-id=439 bgcolor=#E9E9E9
| 326439 ||  || — || October 19, 2001 || Kitt Peak || Spacewatch || — || align=right | 1.6 km || 
|-id=440 bgcolor=#E9E9E9
| 326440 ||  || — || October 20, 2001 || Socorro || LINEAR || JUN || align=right | 1.4 km || 
|-id=441 bgcolor=#E9E9E9
| 326441 ||  || — || October 29, 2001 || Palomar || NEAT || — || align=right | 2.1 km || 
|-id=442 bgcolor=#E9E9E9
| 326442 ||  || — || November 6, 2001 || Socorro || LINEAR || — || align=right | 4.1 km || 
|-id=443 bgcolor=#E9E9E9
| 326443 ||  || — || November 9, 2001 || Socorro || LINEAR || — || align=right | 2.0 km || 
|-id=444 bgcolor=#E9E9E9
| 326444 ||  || — || November 9, 2001 || Socorro || LINEAR || RAF || align=right | 1.3 km || 
|-id=445 bgcolor=#E9E9E9
| 326445 ||  || — || November 10, 2001 || Socorro || LINEAR || — || align=right | 2.2 km || 
|-id=446 bgcolor=#E9E9E9
| 326446 ||  || — || November 10, 2001 || Socorro || LINEAR || — || align=right | 1.9 km || 
|-id=447 bgcolor=#E9E9E9
| 326447 ||  || — || November 10, 2001 || Socorro || LINEAR || — || align=right | 2.0 km || 
|-id=448 bgcolor=#E9E9E9
| 326448 ||  || — || November 10, 2001 || Socorro || LINEAR || HNS || align=right | 1.8 km || 
|-id=449 bgcolor=#E9E9E9
| 326449 ||  || — || November 12, 2001 || Socorro || LINEAR || EUN || align=right | 2.0 km || 
|-id=450 bgcolor=#E9E9E9
| 326450 ||  || — || November 15, 2001 || Socorro || LINEAR || — || align=right | 1.9 km || 
|-id=451 bgcolor=#E9E9E9
| 326451 ||  || — || November 12, 2001 || Socorro || LINEAR || — || align=right | 1.4 km || 
|-id=452 bgcolor=#E9E9E9
| 326452 ||  || — || November 11, 2001 || Apache Point || SDSS || MAR || align=right | 1.0 km || 
|-id=453 bgcolor=#E9E9E9
| 326453 ||  || — || November 18, 2001 || Kitt Peak || Spacewatch || — || align=right | 1.9 km || 
|-id=454 bgcolor=#E9E9E9
| 326454 ||  || — || November 17, 2001 || Socorro || LINEAR || — || align=right | 1.6 km || 
|-id=455 bgcolor=#E9E9E9
| 326455 ||  || — || November 19, 2001 || Socorro || LINEAR || — || align=right | 1.7 km || 
|-id=456 bgcolor=#E9E9E9
| 326456 ||  || — || November 19, 2001 || Anderson Mesa || LONEOS || — || align=right | 1.7 km || 
|-id=457 bgcolor=#E9E9E9
| 326457 ||  || — || December 9, 2001 || Socorro || LINEAR || — || align=right | 2.9 km || 
|-id=458 bgcolor=#E9E9E9
| 326458 ||  || — || December 9, 2001 || Socorro || LINEAR || — || align=right | 2.5 km || 
|-id=459 bgcolor=#E9E9E9
| 326459 ||  || — || December 10, 2001 || Socorro || LINEAR || — || align=right | 1.9 km || 
|-id=460 bgcolor=#E9E9E9
| 326460 ||  || — || November 19, 2001 || Anderson Mesa || LONEOS || EUN || align=right | 1.5 km || 
|-id=461 bgcolor=#E9E9E9
| 326461 ||  || — || December 13, 2001 || Socorro || LINEAR || — || align=right | 2.5 km || 
|-id=462 bgcolor=#E9E9E9
| 326462 ||  || — || December 14, 2001 || Socorro || LINEAR || PAD || align=right | 2.1 km || 
|-id=463 bgcolor=#E9E9E9
| 326463 ||  || — || December 15, 2001 || Socorro || LINEAR || EUN || align=right | 1.7 km || 
|-id=464 bgcolor=#E9E9E9
| 326464 ||  || — || December 18, 2001 || Socorro || LINEAR || — || align=right | 2.4 km || 
|-id=465 bgcolor=#E9E9E9
| 326465 ||  || — || December 18, 2001 || Socorro || LINEAR || DOR || align=right | 2.6 km || 
|-id=466 bgcolor=#E9E9E9
| 326466 ||  || — || December 18, 2001 || Socorro || LINEAR || — || align=right | 3.2 km || 
|-id=467 bgcolor=#E9E9E9
| 326467 ||  || — || December 9, 2001 || Socorro || LINEAR || — || align=right | 3.2 km || 
|-id=468 bgcolor=#E9E9E9
| 326468 ||  || — || January 6, 2002 || Kitt Peak || Spacewatch || — || align=right | 2.7 km || 
|-id=469 bgcolor=#E9E9E9
| 326469 ||  || — || January 9, 2002 || Socorro || LINEAR || GEF || align=right | 1.5 km || 
|-id=470 bgcolor=#E9E9E9
| 326470 ||  || — || January 9, 2002 || Socorro || LINEAR || — || align=right | 2.7 km || 
|-id=471 bgcolor=#E9E9E9
| 326471 ||  || — || January 13, 2002 || Socorro || LINEAR || MRX || align=right | 1.2 km || 
|-id=472 bgcolor=#E9E9E9
| 326472 ||  || — || January 9, 2002 || Socorro || LINEAR || GER || align=right | 1.7 km || 
|-id=473 bgcolor=#E9E9E9
| 326473 ||  || — || January 13, 2002 || Socorro || LINEAR || — || align=right | 2.8 km || 
|-id=474 bgcolor=#E9E9E9
| 326474 ||  || — || January 15, 2002 || Socorro || LINEAR || DOR || align=right | 2.8 km || 
|-id=475 bgcolor=#E9E9E9
| 326475 ||  || — || January 14, 2002 || Socorro || LINEAR || — || align=right | 2.2 km || 
|-id=476 bgcolor=#E9E9E9
| 326476 ||  || — || January 14, 2002 || Socorro || LINEAR || — || align=right | 3.0 km || 
|-id=477 bgcolor=#E9E9E9
| 326477 ||  || — || January 9, 2002 || Apache Point || SDSS || MAR || align=right | 1.1 km || 
|-id=478 bgcolor=#E9E9E9
| 326478 ||  || — || January 19, 2002 || Kitt Peak || Spacewatch || — || align=right | 1.9 km || 
|-id=479 bgcolor=#E9E9E9
| 326479 ||  || — || February 5, 2002 || Palomar || NEAT || DOR || align=right | 3.0 km || 
|-id=480 bgcolor=#E9E9E9
| 326480 ||  || — || February 3, 2002 || Haleakala || NEAT || — || align=right | 3.0 km || 
|-id=481 bgcolor=#E9E9E9
| 326481 ||  || — || February 7, 2002 || Socorro || LINEAR || GEF || align=right | 2.2 km || 
|-id=482 bgcolor=#E9E9E9
| 326482 ||  || — || February 6, 2002 || Socorro || LINEAR || — || align=right | 3.3 km || 
|-id=483 bgcolor=#d6d6d6
| 326483 ||  || — || February 8, 2002 || Socorro || LINEAR || — || align=right | 3.5 km || 
|-id=484 bgcolor=#E9E9E9
| 326484 ||  || — || February 10, 2002 || Socorro || LINEAR || — || align=right | 2.5 km || 
|-id=485 bgcolor=#fefefe
| 326485 ||  || — || March 6, 2002 || Siding Spring || R. H. McNaught || — || align=right data-sort-value="0.55" | 550 m || 
|-id=486 bgcolor=#d6d6d6
| 326486 ||  || — || March 9, 2002 || Socorro || LINEAR || — || align=right | 3.6 km || 
|-id=487 bgcolor=#E9E9E9
| 326487 ||  || — || March 6, 2002 || Siding Spring || R. H. McNaught || HOF || align=right | 2.7 km || 
|-id=488 bgcolor=#FA8072
| 326488 ||  || — || April 4, 2002 || Haleakala || NEAT || — || align=right | 1.0 km || 
|-id=489 bgcolor=#E9E9E9
| 326489 ||  || — || April 7, 2002 || Cerro Tololo || M. W. Buie || — || align=right | 2.2 km || 
|-id=490 bgcolor=#d6d6d6
| 326490 ||  || — || April 10, 2002 || Socorro || LINEAR || — || align=right | 4.0 km || 
|-id=491 bgcolor=#fefefe
| 326491 ||  || — || April 10, 2002 || Socorro || LINEAR || — || align=right data-sort-value="0.95" | 950 m || 
|-id=492 bgcolor=#fefefe
| 326492 ||  || — || April 10, 2002 || Socorro || LINEAR || — || align=right data-sort-value="0.75" | 750 m || 
|-id=493 bgcolor=#fefefe
| 326493 ||  || — || April 10, 2002 || Socorro || LINEAR || — || align=right data-sort-value="0.98" | 980 m || 
|-id=494 bgcolor=#fefefe
| 326494 ||  || — || April 12, 2002 || Palomar || NEAT || — || align=right data-sort-value="0.69" | 690 m || 
|-id=495 bgcolor=#d6d6d6
| 326495 ||  || — || April 19, 2002 || Kitt Peak || Spacewatch || — || align=right | 2.8 km || 
|-id=496 bgcolor=#d6d6d6
| 326496 ||  || — || April 21, 2002 || Kitt Peak || Spacewatch || — || align=right | 2.7 km || 
|-id=497 bgcolor=#fefefe
| 326497 ||  || — || May 5, 2002 || Socorro || LINEAR || — || align=right | 1.4 km || 
|-id=498 bgcolor=#FA8072
| 326498 ||  || — || May 7, 2002 || Socorro || LINEAR || — || align=right | 1.2 km || 
|-id=499 bgcolor=#d6d6d6
| 326499 ||  || — || May 9, 2002 || Socorro || LINEAR || — || align=right | 3.4 km || 
|-id=500 bgcolor=#fefefe
| 326500 ||  || — || May 11, 2002 || Socorro || LINEAR || — || align=right data-sort-value="0.81" | 810 m || 
|}

326501–326600 

|-bgcolor=#fefefe
| 326501 ||  || — || May 7, 2002 || Palomar || NEAT || — || align=right data-sort-value="0.90" | 900 m || 
|-id=502 bgcolor=#d6d6d6
| 326502 ||  || — || May 9, 2002 || Palomar || NEAT || — || align=right | 3.2 km || 
|-id=503 bgcolor=#d6d6d6
| 326503 ||  || — || May 10, 2002 || Palomar || NEAT || — || align=right | 2.9 km || 
|-id=504 bgcolor=#d6d6d6
| 326504 ||  || — || May 18, 2002 || Palomar || NEAT || — || align=right | 3.7 km || 
|-id=505 bgcolor=#fefefe
| 326505 ||  || — || June 5, 2002 || Palomar || NEAT || — || align=right | 1.0 km || 
|-id=506 bgcolor=#d6d6d6
| 326506 ||  || — || June 5, 2002 || Anderson Mesa || LONEOS || — || align=right | 3.4 km || 
|-id=507 bgcolor=#fefefe
| 326507 ||  || — || June 1, 2002 || Palomar || NEAT || — || align=right data-sort-value="0.92" | 920 m || 
|-id=508 bgcolor=#d6d6d6
| 326508 ||  || — || June 1, 2002 || Palomar || NEAT || EOS || align=right | 2.4 km || 
|-id=509 bgcolor=#d6d6d6
| 326509 ||  || — || June 1, 2002 || Palomar || NEAT || EUP || align=right | 4.8 km || 
|-id=510 bgcolor=#d6d6d6
| 326510 ||  || — || June 16, 2002 || Palomar || NEAT || — || align=right | 3.4 km || 
|-id=511 bgcolor=#fefefe
| 326511 ||  || — || July 11, 2002 || Campo Imperatore || CINEOS || MAS || align=right data-sort-value="0.83" | 830 m || 
|-id=512 bgcolor=#d6d6d6
| 326512 ||  || — || July 11, 2002 || Campo Imperatore || CINEOS || THM || align=right | 2.2 km || 
|-id=513 bgcolor=#d6d6d6
| 326513 ||  || — || July 5, 2002 || Kitt Peak || Spacewatch || — || align=right | 3.5 km || 
|-id=514 bgcolor=#d6d6d6
| 326514 ||  || — || July 5, 2002 || Palomar || NEAT || — || align=right | 4.5 km || 
|-id=515 bgcolor=#fefefe
| 326515 ||  || — || July 14, 2002 || Palomar || NEAT || — || align=right | 1.0 km || 
|-id=516 bgcolor=#d6d6d6
| 326516 ||  || — || July 4, 2002 || Palomar || NEAT || — || align=right | 3.6 km || 
|-id=517 bgcolor=#d6d6d6
| 326517 ||  || — || July 15, 2002 || Palomar || NEAT || — || align=right | 5.1 km || 
|-id=518 bgcolor=#d6d6d6
| 326518 ||  || — || July 5, 2002 || Palomar || NEAT || — || align=right | 2.9 km || 
|-id=519 bgcolor=#fefefe
| 326519 ||  || — || July 4, 2002 || Palomar || NEAT || — || align=right data-sort-value="0.66" | 660 m || 
|-id=520 bgcolor=#d6d6d6
| 326520 ||  || — || July 5, 2002 || Palomar || NEAT || — || align=right | 4.1 km || 
|-id=521 bgcolor=#fefefe
| 326521 ||  || — || March 18, 2005 || Catalina || CSS || — || align=right data-sort-value="0.83" | 830 m || 
|-id=522 bgcolor=#fefefe
| 326522 ||  || — || July 2, 2002 || Palomar || NEAT || — || align=right data-sort-value="0.91" | 910 m || 
|-id=523 bgcolor=#d6d6d6
| 326523 ||  || — || July 3, 2002 || Palomar || NEAT || — || align=right | 3.2 km || 
|-id=524 bgcolor=#d6d6d6
| 326524 ||  || — || July 9, 2002 || Palomar || NEAT || EOS || align=right | 2.6 km || 
|-id=525 bgcolor=#d6d6d6
| 326525 ||  || — || September 3, 2008 || Kitt Peak || Spacewatch || — || align=right | 2.7 km || 
|-id=526 bgcolor=#d6d6d6
| 326526 ||  || — || July 20, 2002 || Palomar || NEAT || — || align=right | 3.4 km || 
|-id=527 bgcolor=#d6d6d6
| 326527 ||  || — || July 20, 2002 || Palomar || NEAT || — || align=right | 3.4 km || 
|-id=528 bgcolor=#d6d6d6
| 326528 ||  || — || July 19, 2002 || Palomar || NEAT || — || align=right | 4.5 km || 
|-id=529 bgcolor=#fefefe
| 326529 ||  || — || July 21, 2002 || Palomar || NEAT || — || align=right | 1.1 km || 
|-id=530 bgcolor=#fefefe
| 326530 ||  || — || July 20, 2002 || Palomar || NEAT || — || align=right data-sort-value="0.78" | 780 m || 
|-id=531 bgcolor=#fefefe
| 326531 ||  || — || July 21, 2002 || Palomar || NEAT || — || align=right | 1.3 km || 
|-id=532 bgcolor=#fefefe
| 326532 ||  || — || July 22, 2002 || Palomar || NEAT || — || align=right data-sort-value="0.71" | 710 m || 
|-id=533 bgcolor=#d6d6d6
| 326533 ||  || — || July 23, 2002 || Palomar || NEAT || — || align=right | 4.3 km || 
|-id=534 bgcolor=#fefefe
| 326534 ||  || — || July 29, 2002 || Palomar || NEAT || MAS || align=right data-sort-value="0.82" | 820 m || 
|-id=535 bgcolor=#fefefe
| 326535 ||  || — || July 21, 2002 || Palomar || NEAT || — || align=right | 1.1 km || 
|-id=536 bgcolor=#d6d6d6
| 326536 ||  || — || September 1, 2008 || Dauban || F. Kugel || — || align=right | 3.4 km || 
|-id=537 bgcolor=#d6d6d6
| 326537 ||  || — || October 23, 2003 || Kitt Peak || Spacewatch || VER || align=right | 3.1 km || 
|-id=538 bgcolor=#d6d6d6
| 326538 ||  || — || August 4, 2002 || Palomar || NEAT || — || align=right | 4.4 km || 
|-id=539 bgcolor=#d6d6d6
| 326539 ||  || — || August 4, 2002 || Palomar || NEAT || — || align=right | 3.6 km || 
|-id=540 bgcolor=#d6d6d6
| 326540 ||  || — || August 5, 2002 || Palomar || NEAT || EUP || align=right | 5.0 km || 
|-id=541 bgcolor=#d6d6d6
| 326541 ||  || — || August 4, 2002 || Palomar || NEAT || — || align=right | 3.7 km || 
|-id=542 bgcolor=#d6d6d6
| 326542 ||  || — || August 6, 2002 || Palomar || NEAT || — || align=right | 2.8 km || 
|-id=543 bgcolor=#d6d6d6
| 326543 ||  || — || August 6, 2002 || Palomar || NEAT || EOS || align=right | 3.1 km || 
|-id=544 bgcolor=#fefefe
| 326544 ||  || — || August 6, 2002 || Palomar || NEAT || — || align=right data-sort-value="0.94" | 940 m || 
|-id=545 bgcolor=#d6d6d6
| 326545 ||  || — || August 6, 2002 || Palomar || NEAT || — || align=right | 6.4 km || 
|-id=546 bgcolor=#d6d6d6
| 326546 ||  || — || August 6, 2002 || Palomar || NEAT || HYG || align=right | 3.5 km || 
|-id=547 bgcolor=#fefefe
| 326547 ||  || — || August 10, 2002 || Socorro || LINEAR || — || align=right | 1.3 km || 
|-id=548 bgcolor=#fefefe
| 326548 ||  || — || August 6, 2002 || Palomar || NEAT || FLO || align=right data-sort-value="0.69" | 690 m || 
|-id=549 bgcolor=#d6d6d6
| 326549 ||  || — || August 11, 2002 || Socorro || LINEAR || — || align=right | 3.4 km || 
|-id=550 bgcolor=#d6d6d6
| 326550 ||  || — || July 9, 2002 || Socorro || LINEAR || — || align=right | 4.3 km || 
|-id=551 bgcolor=#d6d6d6
| 326551 ||  || — || August 11, 2002 || Palomar || NEAT || EOS || align=right | 2.4 km || 
|-id=552 bgcolor=#d6d6d6
| 326552 ||  || — || August 11, 2002 || Haleakala || NEAT || — || align=right | 4.8 km || 
|-id=553 bgcolor=#d6d6d6
| 326553 ||  || — || August 12, 2002 || Socorro || LINEAR || — || align=right | 3.9 km || 
|-id=554 bgcolor=#d6d6d6
| 326554 ||  || — || August 13, 2002 || Anderson Mesa || LONEOS || — || align=right | 3.7 km || 
|-id=555 bgcolor=#d6d6d6
| 326555 ||  || — || August 13, 2002 || Anderson Mesa || LONEOS || — || align=right | 4.5 km || 
|-id=556 bgcolor=#d6d6d6
| 326556 ||  || — || August 14, 2002 || Socorro || LINEAR || TIR || align=right | 4.0 km || 
|-id=557 bgcolor=#d6d6d6
| 326557 ||  || — || August 8, 2002 || Palomar || S. F. Hönig || THM || align=right | 2.6 km || 
|-id=558 bgcolor=#d6d6d6
| 326558 ||  || — || August 13, 2002 || Kitt Peak || Spacewatch || — || align=right | 3.3 km || 
|-id=559 bgcolor=#d6d6d6
| 326559 ||  || — || August 8, 2002 || Palomar || A. Lowe || THM || align=right | 2.6 km || 
|-id=560 bgcolor=#fefefe
| 326560 ||  || — || August 11, 2002 || Haleakala || NEAT || — || align=right data-sort-value="0.73" | 730 m || 
|-id=561 bgcolor=#d6d6d6
| 326561 ||  || — || August 15, 2002 || Palomar || NEAT || HYG || align=right | 3.0 km || 
|-id=562 bgcolor=#d6d6d6
| 326562 ||  || — || August 11, 2002 || Palomar || NEAT || HYG || align=right | 3.2 km || 
|-id=563 bgcolor=#d6d6d6
| 326563 ||  || — || July 28, 2002 || Palomar || NEAT || — || align=right | 3.2 km || 
|-id=564 bgcolor=#d6d6d6
| 326564 ||  || — || August 11, 2002 || Palomar || NEAT || EOS || align=right | 2.4 km || 
|-id=565 bgcolor=#d6d6d6
| 326565 ||  || — || August 8, 2002 || Palomar || NEAT || — || align=right | 5.2 km || 
|-id=566 bgcolor=#d6d6d6
| 326566 ||  || — || February 24, 2006 || Kitt Peak || Spacewatch || EOS || align=right | 2.7 km || 
|-id=567 bgcolor=#d6d6d6
| 326567 ||  || — || October 22, 2003 || Apache Point || SDSS || — || align=right | 3.4 km || 
|-id=568 bgcolor=#d6d6d6
| 326568 ||  || — || November 26, 2003 || Kitt Peak || Spacewatch || — || align=right | 3.8 km || 
|-id=569 bgcolor=#d6d6d6
| 326569 ||  || — || August 16, 2002 || Haleakala || NEAT || — || align=right | 4.4 km || 
|-id=570 bgcolor=#fefefe
| 326570 ||  || — || August 24, 2002 || Palomar || NEAT || — || align=right | 1.0 km || 
|-id=571 bgcolor=#d6d6d6
| 326571 ||  || — || August 27, 2002 || Palomar || NEAT || — || align=right | 3.8 km || 
|-id=572 bgcolor=#fefefe
| 326572 ||  || — || August 27, 2002 || Palomar || NEAT || V || align=right data-sort-value="0.56" | 560 m || 
|-id=573 bgcolor=#fefefe
| 326573 ||  || — || August 29, 2002 || Palomar || NEAT || NYS || align=right data-sort-value="0.70" | 700 m || 
|-id=574 bgcolor=#fefefe
| 326574 ||  || — || August 29, 2002 || Palomar || NEAT || NYS || align=right data-sort-value="0.69" | 690 m || 
|-id=575 bgcolor=#fefefe
| 326575 ||  || — || August 29, 2002 || Palomar || NEAT || — || align=right | 1.1 km || 
|-id=576 bgcolor=#d6d6d6
| 326576 ||  || — || August 30, 2002 || Palomar || NEAT || — || align=right | 4.3 km || 
|-id=577 bgcolor=#d6d6d6
| 326577 ||  || — || August 17, 2002 || Haleakala || A. Lowe || — || align=right | 3.8 km || 
|-id=578 bgcolor=#fefefe
| 326578 ||  || — || August 17, 2002 || Palomar || NEAT || FLO || align=right data-sort-value="0.68" | 680 m || 
|-id=579 bgcolor=#d6d6d6
| 326579 ||  || — || August 28, 2002 || Palomar || NEAT || — || align=right | 4.1 km || 
|-id=580 bgcolor=#d6d6d6
| 326580 ||  || — || August 28, 2002 || Palomar || NEAT || — || align=right | 3.1 km || 
|-id=581 bgcolor=#d6d6d6
| 326581 ||  || — || August 27, 2002 || Palomar || NEAT || — || align=right | 4.3 km || 
|-id=582 bgcolor=#fefefe
| 326582 ||  || — || August 19, 2002 || Palomar || NEAT || — || align=right data-sort-value="0.92" | 920 m || 
|-id=583 bgcolor=#fefefe
| 326583 ||  || — || August 18, 2002 || Palomar || NEAT || NYS || align=right data-sort-value="0.65" | 650 m || 
|-id=584 bgcolor=#fefefe
| 326584 ||  || — || August 18, 2002 || Palomar || NEAT || NYS || align=right data-sort-value="0.66" | 660 m || 
|-id=585 bgcolor=#d6d6d6
| 326585 ||  || — || August 28, 2002 || Palomar || NEAT || HYG || align=right | 2.8 km || 
|-id=586 bgcolor=#d6d6d6
| 326586 ||  || — || August 16, 2002 || Palomar || NEAT || LIX || align=right | 3.4 km || 
|-id=587 bgcolor=#d6d6d6
| 326587 ||  || — || August 29, 2002 || Palomar || NEAT || — || align=right | 5.8 km || 
|-id=588 bgcolor=#fefefe
| 326588 ||  || — || August 17, 2002 || Palomar || NEAT || — || align=right data-sort-value="0.74" | 740 m || 
|-id=589 bgcolor=#d6d6d6
| 326589 ||  || — || August 19, 2002 || Palomar || NEAT || EOS || align=right | 2.9 km || 
|-id=590 bgcolor=#d6d6d6
| 326590 ||  || — || August 27, 2002 || Palomar || NEAT || Tj (2.98) || align=right | 3.5 km || 
|-id=591 bgcolor=#d6d6d6
| 326591 ||  || — || August 19, 2002 || Palomar || NEAT || — || align=right | 4.3 km || 
|-id=592 bgcolor=#fefefe
| 326592 ||  || — || August 17, 2002 || Palomar || NEAT || V || align=right data-sort-value="0.93" | 930 m || 
|-id=593 bgcolor=#d6d6d6
| 326593 ||  || — || December 5, 2010 || Mount Lemmon || Mount Lemmon Survey || — || align=right | 4.6 km || 
|-id=594 bgcolor=#d6d6d6
| 326594 ||  || — || February 27, 2006 || Mount Lemmon || Mount Lemmon Survey || — || align=right | 3.4 km || 
|-id=595 bgcolor=#d6d6d6
| 326595 ||  || — || March 10, 2011 || Mount Lemmon || Mount Lemmon Survey || — || align=right | 3.7 km || 
|-id=596 bgcolor=#d6d6d6
| 326596 ||  || — || February 27, 2006 || Kitt Peak || Spacewatch || — || align=right | 2.9 km || 
|-id=597 bgcolor=#fefefe
| 326597 ||  || — || September 1, 2002 || Palomar || NEAT || — || align=right | 1.2 km || 
|-id=598 bgcolor=#d6d6d6
| 326598 ||  || — || September 3, 2002 || Palomar || NEAT || — || align=right | 3.2 km || 
|-id=599 bgcolor=#d6d6d6
| 326599 ||  || — || September 3, 2002 || Palomar || NEAT || — || align=right | 4.5 km || 
|-id=600 bgcolor=#E9E9E9
| 326600 ||  || — || September 3, 2002 || Palomar || NEAT || — || align=right | 1.3 km || 
|}

326601–326700 

|-bgcolor=#fefefe
| 326601 ||  || — || September 3, 2002 || Haleakala || NEAT || NYS || align=right data-sort-value="0.64" | 640 m || 
|-id=602 bgcolor=#fefefe
| 326602 ||  || — || September 4, 2002 || Anderson Mesa || LONEOS || — || align=right | 1.3 km || 
|-id=603 bgcolor=#fefefe
| 326603 ||  || — || September 3, 2002 || Haleakala || NEAT || — || align=right data-sort-value="0.84" | 840 m || 
|-id=604 bgcolor=#d6d6d6
| 326604 ||  || — || September 4, 2002 || Anderson Mesa || LONEOS || — || align=right | 3.6 km || 
|-id=605 bgcolor=#d6d6d6
| 326605 ||  || — || September 4, 2002 || Anderson Mesa || LONEOS || ALA || align=right | 6.5 km || 
|-id=606 bgcolor=#fefefe
| 326606 ||  || — || September 5, 2002 || Anderson Mesa || LONEOS || — || align=right data-sort-value="0.77" | 770 m || 
|-id=607 bgcolor=#d6d6d6
| 326607 ||  || — || August 31, 2002 || Anderson Mesa || LONEOS || — || align=right | 4.3 km || 
|-id=608 bgcolor=#fefefe
| 326608 ||  || — || September 5, 2002 || Socorro || LINEAR || — || align=right | 1.0 km || 
|-id=609 bgcolor=#fefefe
| 326609 ||  || — || September 5, 2002 || Socorro || LINEAR || — || align=right | 1.2 km || 
|-id=610 bgcolor=#d6d6d6
| 326610 ||  || — || September 4, 2002 || Palomar || NEAT || — || align=right | 5.4 km || 
|-id=611 bgcolor=#fefefe
| 326611 ||  || — || September 5, 2002 || Socorro || LINEAR || — || align=right data-sort-value="0.98" | 980 m || 
|-id=612 bgcolor=#fefefe
| 326612 ||  || — || September 5, 2002 || Socorro || LINEAR || — || align=right data-sort-value="0.89" | 890 m || 
|-id=613 bgcolor=#fefefe
| 326613 ||  || — || September 5, 2002 || Socorro || LINEAR || — || align=right | 1.2 km || 
|-id=614 bgcolor=#fefefe
| 326614 ||  || — || September 6, 2002 || Socorro || LINEAR || V || align=right data-sort-value="0.64" | 640 m || 
|-id=615 bgcolor=#d6d6d6
| 326615 ||  || — || September 6, 2002 || Socorro || LINEAR || HYG || align=right | 3.8 km || 
|-id=616 bgcolor=#fefefe
| 326616 ||  || — || September 9, 2002 || Palomar || NEAT || ERI || align=right | 2.1 km || 
|-id=617 bgcolor=#d6d6d6
| 326617 ||  || — || September 10, 2002 || Palomar || NEAT || — || align=right | 3.9 km || 
|-id=618 bgcolor=#fefefe
| 326618 ||  || — || September 10, 2002 || Haleakala || NEAT || — || align=right | 1.2 km || 
|-id=619 bgcolor=#d6d6d6
| 326619 ||  || — || September 12, 2002 || Palomar || NEAT || HYG || align=right | 3.4 km || 
|-id=620 bgcolor=#d6d6d6
| 326620 ||  || — || September 12, 2002 || Palomar || NEAT || THM || align=right | 2.6 km || 
|-id=621 bgcolor=#d6d6d6
| 326621 ||  || — || September 13, 2002 || Socorro || LINEAR || — || align=right | 4.5 km || 
|-id=622 bgcolor=#fefefe
| 326622 ||  || — || September 15, 2002 || Haleakala || NEAT || — || align=right | 1.3 km || 
|-id=623 bgcolor=#d6d6d6
| 326623 ||  || — || September 12, 2002 || Palomar || NEAT || LIX || align=right | 6.2 km || 
|-id=624 bgcolor=#fefefe
| 326624 ||  || — || September 14, 2002 || Palomar || NEAT || NYS || align=right data-sort-value="0.61" | 610 m || 
|-id=625 bgcolor=#fefefe
| 326625 ||  || — || September 15, 2002 || Kitt Peak || Spacewatch || — || align=right data-sort-value="0.81" | 810 m || 
|-id=626 bgcolor=#fefefe
| 326626 ||  || — || September 15, 2002 || Haleakala || NEAT || — || align=right | 1.0 km || 
|-id=627 bgcolor=#d6d6d6
| 326627 ||  || — || September 14, 2002 || Palomar || NEAT || — || align=right | 2.8 km || 
|-id=628 bgcolor=#d6d6d6
| 326628 ||  || — || September 14, 2002 || Palomar || NEAT || — || align=right | 3.5 km || 
|-id=629 bgcolor=#d6d6d6
| 326629 ||  || — || September 15, 2002 || Xinglong || SCAP || — || align=right | 4.7 km || 
|-id=630 bgcolor=#fefefe
| 326630 ||  || — || September 13, 2002 || Palomar || NEAT || V || align=right data-sort-value="0.56" | 560 m || 
|-id=631 bgcolor=#fefefe
| 326631 ||  || — || September 3, 2002 || Palomar || NEAT || — || align=right | 1.1 km || 
|-id=632 bgcolor=#d6d6d6
| 326632 ||  || — || March 25, 2006 || Kitt Peak || Spacewatch || VER || align=right | 3.2 km || 
|-id=633 bgcolor=#fefefe
| 326633 ||  || — || September 27, 2002 || Palomar || NEAT || NYS || align=right data-sort-value="0.60" | 600 m || 
|-id=634 bgcolor=#d6d6d6
| 326634 ||  || — || September 27, 2002 || Palomar || NEAT || — || align=right | 3.9 km || 
|-id=635 bgcolor=#fefefe
| 326635 ||  || — || September 26, 2002 || Palomar || NEAT || V || align=right data-sort-value="0.82" | 820 m || 
|-id=636 bgcolor=#fefefe
| 326636 ||  || — || September 27, 2002 || Socorro || LINEAR || — || align=right | 1.5 km || 
|-id=637 bgcolor=#d6d6d6
| 326637 ||  || — || September 27, 2002 || Socorro || LINEAR || — || align=right | 6.3 km || 
|-id=638 bgcolor=#fefefe
| 326638 ||  || — || September 28, 2002 || Haleakala || NEAT || — || align=right | 1.4 km || 
|-id=639 bgcolor=#fefefe
| 326639 ||  || — || September 29, 2002 || Haleakala || NEAT || NYS || align=right data-sort-value="0.58" | 580 m || 
|-id=640 bgcolor=#fefefe
| 326640 ||  || — || September 28, 2002 || Palomar || NEAT || — || align=right | 1.0 km || 
|-id=641 bgcolor=#fefefe
| 326641 ||  || — || September 28, 2002 || Haleakala || NEAT || — || align=right | 1.0 km || 
|-id=642 bgcolor=#fefefe
| 326642 ||  || — || September 29, 2002 || Haleakala || NEAT || NYS || align=right data-sort-value="0.88" | 880 m || 
|-id=643 bgcolor=#d6d6d6
| 326643 ||  || — || September 30, 2002 || Socorro || LINEAR || — || align=right | 4.2 km || 
|-id=644 bgcolor=#d6d6d6
| 326644 ||  || — || September 30, 2002 || Socorro || LINEAR || — || align=right | 4.3 km || 
|-id=645 bgcolor=#fefefe
| 326645 ||  || — || September 30, 2002 || Socorro || LINEAR || V || align=right data-sort-value="0.88" | 880 m || 
|-id=646 bgcolor=#FA8072
| 326646 ||  || — || October 1, 2002 || Haleakala || NEAT || — || align=right data-sort-value="0.94" | 940 m || 
|-id=647 bgcolor=#fefefe
| 326647 ||  || — || October 2, 2002 || Socorro || LINEAR || — || align=right | 1.0 km || 
|-id=648 bgcolor=#fefefe
| 326648 ||  || — || October 2, 2002 || Socorro || LINEAR || — || align=right | 1.4 km || 
|-id=649 bgcolor=#fefefe
| 326649 ||  || — || October 2, 2002 || Haleakala || NEAT || NYS || align=right data-sort-value="0.79" | 790 m || 
|-id=650 bgcolor=#fefefe
| 326650 ||  || — || October 3, 2002 || Palomar || NEAT || H || align=right | 1.0 km || 
|-id=651 bgcolor=#fefefe
| 326651 ||  || — || October 3, 2002 || Socorro || LINEAR || PHO || align=right | 1.7 km || 
|-id=652 bgcolor=#fefefe
| 326652 ||  || — || October 4, 2002 || Socorro || LINEAR || V || align=right data-sort-value="0.80" | 800 m || 
|-id=653 bgcolor=#fefefe
| 326653 ||  || — || October 4, 2002 || Socorro || LINEAR || — || align=right data-sort-value="0.92" | 920 m || 
|-id=654 bgcolor=#d6d6d6
| 326654 ||  || — || October 4, 2002 || Palomar || NEAT || — || align=right | 5.5 km || 
|-id=655 bgcolor=#fefefe
| 326655 ||  || — || October 5, 2002 || Palomar || NEAT || — || align=right data-sort-value="0.78" | 780 m || 
|-id=656 bgcolor=#fefefe
| 326656 ||  || — || October 4, 2002 || Socorro || LINEAR || — || align=right | 1.0 km || 
|-id=657 bgcolor=#fefefe
| 326657 ||  || — || October 4, 2002 || Socorro || LINEAR || H || align=right data-sort-value="0.60" | 600 m || 
|-id=658 bgcolor=#d6d6d6
| 326658 ||  || — || October 6, 2002 || Socorro || LINEAR || — || align=right | 5.1 km || 
|-id=659 bgcolor=#fefefe
| 326659 ||  || — || October 8, 2002 || Anderson Mesa || LONEOS || NYS || align=right data-sort-value="0.90" | 900 m || 
|-id=660 bgcolor=#d6d6d6
| 326660 ||  || — || October 6, 2002 || Socorro || LINEAR || EUP || align=right | 4.4 km || 
|-id=661 bgcolor=#fefefe
| 326661 ||  || — || October 8, 2002 || Anderson Mesa || LONEOS || FLO || align=right data-sort-value="0.78" | 780 m || 
|-id=662 bgcolor=#fefefe
| 326662 ||  || — || October 15, 2002 || Palomar || NEAT || V || align=right data-sort-value="0.79" | 790 m || 
|-id=663 bgcolor=#d6d6d6
| 326663 ||  || — || October 5, 2002 || Apache Point || SDSS || — || align=right | 3.2 km || 
|-id=664 bgcolor=#fefefe
| 326664 ||  || — || October 5, 2002 || Apache Point || SDSS || V || align=right data-sort-value="0.80" | 800 m || 
|-id=665 bgcolor=#fefefe
| 326665 ||  || — || October 6, 2002 || Haleakala || NEAT || ERI || align=right | 1.6 km || 
|-id=666 bgcolor=#fefefe
| 326666 ||  || — || October 28, 2002 || Kitt Peak || Spacewatch || — || align=right | 1.2 km || 
|-id=667 bgcolor=#fefefe
| 326667 ||  || — || October 29, 2002 || Palomar || NEAT || LCI || align=right | 1.6 km || 
|-id=668 bgcolor=#d6d6d6
| 326668 ||  || — || October 28, 2002 || Palomar || NEAT || — || align=right | 5.2 km || 
|-id=669 bgcolor=#fefefe
| 326669 ||  || — || October 26, 2002 || Haleakala || NEAT || V || align=right | 1.0 km || 
|-id=670 bgcolor=#fefefe
| 326670 ||  || — || October 31, 2002 || Palomar || NEAT || V || align=right data-sort-value="0.95" | 950 m || 
|-id=671 bgcolor=#d6d6d6
| 326671 ||  || — || October 31, 2002 || Socorro || LINEAR || Tj (2.97) || align=right | 7.0 km || 
|-id=672 bgcolor=#fefefe
| 326672 ||  || — || October 30, 2002 || Apache Point || SDSS || MAS || align=right data-sort-value="0.64" | 640 m || 
|-id=673 bgcolor=#fefefe
| 326673 ||  || — || November 1, 2002 || Socorro || LINEAR || PHO || align=right | 1.6 km || 
|-id=674 bgcolor=#E9E9E9
| 326674 ||  || — || November 4, 2002 || Anderson Mesa || LONEOS || — || align=right | 3.1 km || 
|-id=675 bgcolor=#fefefe
| 326675 ||  || — || November 12, 2002 || Socorro || LINEAR || — || align=right data-sort-value="0.97" | 970 m || 
|-id=676 bgcolor=#fefefe
| 326676 ||  || — || November 11, 2002 || Anderson Mesa || LONEOS || H || align=right data-sort-value="0.60" | 600 m || 
|-id=677 bgcolor=#fefefe
| 326677 ||  || — || November 11, 2002 || Socorro || LINEAR || V || align=right data-sort-value="0.78" | 780 m || 
|-id=678 bgcolor=#fefefe
| 326678 ||  || — || November 12, 2002 || Palomar || NEAT || — || align=right | 1.3 km || 
|-id=679 bgcolor=#fefefe
| 326679 ||  || — || November 14, 2002 || Socorro || LINEAR || — || align=right | 1.4 km || 
|-id=680 bgcolor=#d6d6d6
| 326680 ||  || — || November 6, 2002 || Socorro || LINEAR || — || align=right | 4.1 km || 
|-id=681 bgcolor=#E9E9E9
| 326681 ||  || — || November 13, 2002 || Palomar || NEAT || RAF || align=right data-sort-value="0.96" | 960 m || 
|-id=682 bgcolor=#E9E9E9
| 326682 ||  || — || November 14, 2002 || Palomar || NEAT || — || align=right | 1.3 km || 
|-id=683 bgcolor=#FFC2E0
| 326683 ||  || — || November 18, 2002 || Palomar || NEAT || AMO || align=right data-sort-value="0.52" | 520 m || 
|-id=684 bgcolor=#fefefe
| 326684 ||  || — || December 2, 2002 || Socorro || LINEAR || MAS || align=right | 1.1 km || 
|-id=685 bgcolor=#fefefe
| 326685 ||  || — || December 7, 2002 || Desert Eagle || W. K. Y. Yeung || V || align=right data-sort-value="0.89" | 890 m || 
|-id=686 bgcolor=#E9E9E9
| 326686 ||  || — || December 1, 2002 || Socorro || LINEAR || — || align=right data-sort-value="0.85" | 850 m || 
|-id=687 bgcolor=#E9E9E9
| 326687 ||  || — || December 10, 2002 || Socorro || LINEAR || — || align=right | 1.3 km || 
|-id=688 bgcolor=#E9E9E9
| 326688 ||  || — || December 11, 2002 || Socorro || LINEAR || — || align=right | 1.5 km || 
|-id=689 bgcolor=#E9E9E9
| 326689 ||  || — || December 11, 2002 || Socorro || LINEAR || BAR || align=right | 1.5 km || 
|-id=690 bgcolor=#E9E9E9
| 326690 ||  || — || December 5, 2002 || Socorro || LINEAR || — || align=right | 1.3 km || 
|-id=691 bgcolor=#E9E9E9
| 326691 ||  || — || December 11, 2002 || Apache Point || SDSS || EUN || align=right | 1.4 km || 
|-id=692 bgcolor=#E9E9E9
| 326692 ||  || — || December 31, 2002 || Socorro || LINEAR || — || align=right | 1.3 km || 
|-id=693 bgcolor=#E9E9E9
| 326693 ||  || — || January 1, 2003 || Socorro || LINEAR || — || align=right | 2.3 km || 
|-id=694 bgcolor=#E9E9E9
| 326694 ||  || — || January 5, 2003 || Socorro || LINEAR || — || align=right | 1.8 km || 
|-id=695 bgcolor=#E9E9E9
| 326695 ||  || — || January 4, 2003 || Socorro || LINEAR || — || align=right | 1.9 km || 
|-id=696 bgcolor=#E9E9E9
| 326696 ||  || — || January 5, 2003 || Socorro || LINEAR || — || align=right | 1.7 km || 
|-id=697 bgcolor=#E9E9E9
| 326697 ||  || — || January 5, 2003 || Socorro || LINEAR || — || align=right | 1.5 km || 
|-id=698 bgcolor=#E9E9E9
| 326698 ||  || — || January 10, 2003 || Socorro || LINEAR || RAF || align=right | 1.3 km || 
|-id=699 bgcolor=#E9E9E9
| 326699 ||  || — || January 25, 2003 || Palomar || NEAT || — || align=right | 4.1 km || 
|-id=700 bgcolor=#E9E9E9
| 326700 ||  || — || January 25, 2003 || Anderson Mesa || LONEOS || JUN || align=right | 1.7 km || 
|}

326701–326800 

|-bgcolor=#E9E9E9
| 326701 ||  || — || January 25, 2003 || Kitt Peak || Spacewatch || ADE || align=right | 2.6 km || 
|-id=702 bgcolor=#E9E9E9
| 326702 ||  || — || January 26, 2003 || Haleakala || NEAT || — || align=right | 1.7 km || 
|-id=703 bgcolor=#E9E9E9
| 326703 ||  || — || January 27, 2003 || Socorro || LINEAR || — || align=right data-sort-value="0.97" | 970 m || 
|-id=704 bgcolor=#E9E9E9
| 326704 ||  || — || January 28, 2003 || Socorro || LINEAR || RAF || align=right | 1.1 km || 
|-id=705 bgcolor=#E9E9E9
| 326705 ||  || — || January 30, 2003 || Anderson Mesa || LONEOS || EUN || align=right | 1.7 km || 
|-id=706 bgcolor=#E9E9E9
| 326706 ||  || — || January 29, 2003 || Palomar || NEAT || — || align=right | 1.7 km || 
|-id=707 bgcolor=#E9E9E9
| 326707 ||  || — || January 29, 2003 || Palomar || NEAT || — || align=right | 2.5 km || 
|-id=708 bgcolor=#E9E9E9
| 326708 ||  || — || January 30, 2003 || Anderson Mesa || LONEOS || — || align=right | 1.7 km || 
|-id=709 bgcolor=#E9E9E9
| 326709 ||  || — || January 31, 2003 || Socorro || LINEAR || — || align=right | 1.6 km || 
|-id=710 bgcolor=#E9E9E9
| 326710 ||  || — || January 26, 2003 || Haleakala || NEAT || EUN || align=right | 1.5 km || 
|-id=711 bgcolor=#E9E9E9
| 326711 ||  || — || February 3, 2003 || Anderson Mesa || LONEOS || — || align=right | 1.3 km || 
|-id=712 bgcolor=#E9E9E9
| 326712 ||  || — || February 4, 2003 || Socorro || LINEAR || — || align=right | 2.0 km || 
|-id=713 bgcolor=#E9E9E9
| 326713 ||  || — || February 8, 2003 || Socorro || LINEAR || JUN || align=right | 1.2 km || 
|-id=714 bgcolor=#E9E9E9
| 326714 ||  || — || February 23, 2003 || Campo Imperatore || CINEOS || — || align=right | 1.2 km || 
|-id=715 bgcolor=#E9E9E9
| 326715 ||  || — || March 6, 2003 || Anderson Mesa || LONEOS || — || align=right | 1.5 km || 
|-id=716 bgcolor=#E9E9E9
| 326716 ||  || — || March 7, 2003 || Socorro || LINEAR || — || align=right | 2.1 km || 
|-id=717 bgcolor=#FA8072
| 326717 ||  || — || March 7, 2003 || Socorro || LINEAR || — || align=right | 2.4 km || 
|-id=718 bgcolor=#E9E9E9
| 326718 ||  || — || March 6, 2003 || Palomar || NEAT || EUN || align=right | 1.3 km || 
|-id=719 bgcolor=#E9E9E9
| 326719 ||  || — || March 7, 2003 || Anderson Mesa || LONEOS || — || align=right | 1.8 km || 
|-id=720 bgcolor=#E9E9E9
| 326720 ||  || — || January 14, 2003 || Palomar || NEAT || JUN || align=right | 1.6 km || 
|-id=721 bgcolor=#E9E9E9
| 326721 ||  || — || March 14, 2003 || Palomar || NEAT || — || align=right | 2.1 km || 
|-id=722 bgcolor=#E9E9E9
| 326722 ||  || — || March 24, 2003 || Haleakala || NEAT || — || align=right | 2.9 km || 
|-id=723 bgcolor=#E9E9E9
| 326723 ||  || — || March 26, 2003 || Palomar || NEAT || — || align=right | 2.1 km || 
|-id=724 bgcolor=#E9E9E9
| 326724 ||  || — || March 27, 2003 || Palomar || NEAT || JUN || align=right | 1.4 km || 
|-id=725 bgcolor=#E9E9E9
| 326725 ||  || — || March 29, 2003 || Anderson Mesa || LONEOS || — || align=right | 2.6 km || 
|-id=726 bgcolor=#E9E9E9
| 326726 ||  || — || March 23, 2003 || Apache Point || SDSS || — || align=right | 2.5 km || 
|-id=727 bgcolor=#E9E9E9
| 326727 ||  || — || April 3, 2003 || Haleakala || NEAT || EUN || align=right | 1.8 km || 
|-id=728 bgcolor=#E9E9E9
| 326728 ||  || — || April 7, 2003 || Palomar || NEAT || — || align=right | 2.6 km || 
|-id=729 bgcolor=#E9E9E9
| 326729 ||  || — || April 9, 2003 || Palomar || NEAT || JUN || align=right | 1.4 km || 
|-id=730 bgcolor=#E9E9E9
| 326730 ||  || — || April 9, 2003 || Kitt Peak || Spacewatch || — || align=right | 3.1 km || 
|-id=731 bgcolor=#E9E9E9
| 326731 ||  || — || April 4, 2003 || Anderson Mesa || LONEOS || JUN || align=right | 1.2 km || 
|-id=732 bgcolor=#FFC2E0
| 326732 ||  || — || April 25, 2003 || Anderson Mesa || LONEOS || AMO +1kmmoon || align=right | 1.0 km || 
|-id=733 bgcolor=#E9E9E9
| 326733 ||  || — || April 26, 2003 || Needville || Needville Obs. || — || align=right | 3.0 km || 
|-id=734 bgcolor=#E9E9E9
| 326734 ||  || — || May 1, 2003 || Kitt Peak || Spacewatch || — || align=right | 2.8 km || 
|-id=735 bgcolor=#E9E9E9
| 326735 ||  || — || May 8, 2003 || Haleakala || NEAT || — || align=right | 3.3 km || 
|-id=736 bgcolor=#E9E9E9
| 326736 ||  || — || May 22, 2003 || Kitt Peak || Spacewatch || — || align=right | 3.4 km || 
|-id=737 bgcolor=#E9E9E9
| 326737 ||  || — || May 22, 2003 || Kitt Peak || Spacewatch || — || align=right | 4.0 km || 
|-id=738 bgcolor=#FA8072
| 326738 ||  || — || August 1, 2003 || Haleakala || NEAT || — || align=right data-sort-value="0.76" | 760 m || 
|-id=739 bgcolor=#fefefe
| 326739 ||  || — || August 20, 2003 || Palomar || NEAT || FLO || align=right data-sort-value="0.66" | 660 m || 
|-id=740 bgcolor=#FA8072
| 326740 ||  || — || August 22, 2003 || Socorro || LINEAR || — || align=right data-sort-value="0.57" | 570 m || 
|-id=741 bgcolor=#FA8072
| 326741 ||  || — || August 22, 2003 || Haleakala || NEAT || — || align=right | 2.4 km || 
|-id=742 bgcolor=#FFC2E0
| 326742 ||  || — || August 26, 2003 || Socorro || LINEAR || AMO +1km || align=right data-sort-value="0.85" | 850 m || 
|-id=743 bgcolor=#fefefe
| 326743 ||  || — || August 23, 2003 || Palomar || NEAT || — || align=right data-sort-value="0.96" | 960 m || 
|-id=744 bgcolor=#d6d6d6
| 326744 ||  || — || August 24, 2003 || Socorro || LINEAR || THB || align=right | 4.6 km || 
|-id=745 bgcolor=#d6d6d6
| 326745 ||  || — || August 24, 2003 || Cerro Tololo || M. W. Buie || THM || align=right | 1.9 km || 
|-id=746 bgcolor=#E9E9E9
| 326746 ||  || — || September 1, 2003 || Socorro || LINEAR || POS || align=right | 4.7 km || 
|-id=747 bgcolor=#fefefe
| 326747 ||  || — || September 14, 2003 || Haleakala || NEAT || — || align=right data-sort-value="0.79" | 790 m || 
|-id=748 bgcolor=#fefefe
| 326748 ||  || — || September 14, 2003 || Haleakala || NEAT || FLO || align=right data-sort-value="0.71" | 710 m || 
|-id=749 bgcolor=#fefefe
| 326749 ||  || — || September 15, 2003 || Anderson Mesa || LONEOS || — || align=right data-sort-value="0.87" | 870 m || 
|-id=750 bgcolor=#d6d6d6
| 326750 ||  || — || September 15, 2003 || Palomar || NEAT || URS || align=right | 3.7 km || 
|-id=751 bgcolor=#d6d6d6
| 326751 ||  || — || September 16, 2003 || Kitt Peak || Spacewatch || — || align=right | 3.6 km || 
|-id=752 bgcolor=#d6d6d6
| 326752 ||  || — || September 18, 2003 || Palomar || NEAT || — || align=right | 4.8 km || 
|-id=753 bgcolor=#fefefe
| 326753 ||  || — || September 16, 2003 || Palomar || NEAT || PHO || align=right | 1.3 km || 
|-id=754 bgcolor=#d6d6d6
| 326754 ||  || — || September 17, 2003 || Kitt Peak || Spacewatch || EUP || align=right | 6.2 km || 
|-id=755 bgcolor=#fefefe
| 326755 ||  || — || September 17, 2003 || Kitt Peak || Spacewatch || — || align=right data-sort-value="0.73" | 730 m || 
|-id=756 bgcolor=#d6d6d6
| 326756 ||  || — || September 19, 2003 || Campo Imperatore || CINEOS || — || align=right | 4.9 km || 
|-id=757 bgcolor=#d6d6d6
| 326757 ||  || — || September 17, 2003 || Kitt Peak || Spacewatch || EOS || align=right | 2.0 km || 
|-id=758 bgcolor=#d6d6d6
| 326758 ||  || — || September 18, 2003 || Kitt Peak || Spacewatch || EOS || align=right | 2.8 km || 
|-id=759 bgcolor=#d6d6d6
| 326759 ||  || — || September 16, 2003 || Palomar || NEAT || URS || align=right | 4.1 km || 
|-id=760 bgcolor=#d6d6d6
| 326760 ||  || — || September 17, 2003 || Socorro || LINEAR || — || align=right | 4.0 km || 
|-id=761 bgcolor=#fefefe
| 326761 ||  || — || September 18, 2003 || Kitt Peak || Spacewatch || — || align=right data-sort-value="0.86" | 860 m || 
|-id=762 bgcolor=#fefefe
| 326762 ||  || — || September 21, 2003 || Anderson Mesa || LONEOS || — || align=right | 1.1 km || 
|-id=763 bgcolor=#d6d6d6
| 326763 ||  || — || September 18, 2003 || Kitt Peak || Spacewatch || — || align=right | 5.8 km || 
|-id=764 bgcolor=#d6d6d6
| 326764 ||  || — || September 20, 2003 || Campo Imperatore || CINEOS || — || align=right | 3.8 km || 
|-id=765 bgcolor=#d6d6d6
| 326765 ||  || — || September 20, 2003 || Anderson Mesa || LONEOS || ALA || align=right | 4.1 km || 
|-id=766 bgcolor=#d6d6d6
| 326766 ||  || — || September 20, 2003 || Anderson Mesa || LONEOS || TIR || align=right | 3.4 km || 
|-id=767 bgcolor=#d6d6d6
| 326767 ||  || — || September 18, 2003 || Palomar || NEAT || — || align=right | 4.3 km || 
|-id=768 bgcolor=#fefefe
| 326768 ||  || — || September 20, 2003 || Socorro || LINEAR || FLO || align=right data-sort-value="0.56" | 560 m || 
|-id=769 bgcolor=#FA8072
| 326769 ||  || — || September 19, 2003 || Palomar || NEAT || — || align=right | 1.2 km || 
|-id=770 bgcolor=#d6d6d6
| 326770 ||  || — || September 20, 2003 || Socorro || LINEAR || — || align=right | 5.2 km || 
|-id=771 bgcolor=#d6d6d6
| 326771 ||  || — || September 20, 2003 || Palomar || NEAT || — || align=right | 4.8 km || 
|-id=772 bgcolor=#d6d6d6
| 326772 ||  || — || September 20, 2003 || Palomar || NEAT || EOS || align=right | 3.1 km || 
|-id=773 bgcolor=#d6d6d6
| 326773 ||  || — || September 21, 2003 || Anderson Mesa || LONEOS || — || align=right | 3.6 km || 
|-id=774 bgcolor=#fefefe
| 326774 ||  || — || September 22, 2003 || Anderson Mesa || LONEOS || — || align=right data-sort-value="0.70" | 700 m || 
|-id=775 bgcolor=#fefefe
| 326775 ||  || — || September 25, 2003 || Ondřejov || P. Kušnirák || — || align=right data-sort-value="0.79" | 790 m || 
|-id=776 bgcolor=#fefefe
| 326776 ||  || — || September 29, 2003 || Desert Eagle || W. K. Y. Yeung || FLO || align=right data-sort-value="0.85" | 850 m || 
|-id=777 bgcolor=#FFC2E0
| 326777 ||  || — || September 30, 2003 || Socorro || LINEAR || AMO +1km || align=right data-sort-value="0.98" | 980 m || 
|-id=778 bgcolor=#d6d6d6
| 326778 ||  || — || September 28, 2003 || Desert Eagle || W. K. Y. Yeung || — || align=right | 5.5 km || 
|-id=779 bgcolor=#d6d6d6
| 326779 ||  || — || September 30, 2003 || Junk Bond || D. Healy || — || align=right | 4.2 km || 
|-id=780 bgcolor=#d6d6d6
| 326780 ||  || — || September 26, 2003 || Socorro || LINEAR || HYG || align=right | 3.3 km || 
|-id=781 bgcolor=#d6d6d6
| 326781 ||  || — || September 25, 2003 || Palomar || NEAT || EOS || align=right | 2.7 km || 
|-id=782 bgcolor=#d6d6d6
| 326782 ||  || — || September 25, 2003 || Palomar || NEAT || EOS || align=right | 3.6 km || 
|-id=783 bgcolor=#fefefe
| 326783 ||  || — || September 27, 2003 || Kitt Peak || Spacewatch || NYS || align=right data-sort-value="0.61" | 610 m || 
|-id=784 bgcolor=#d6d6d6
| 326784 ||  || — || September 18, 2003 || Kitt Peak || Spacewatch || — || align=right | 3.7 km || 
|-id=785 bgcolor=#d6d6d6
| 326785 ||  || — || September 20, 2003 || Bergisch Gladbach || W. Bickel || — || align=right | 4.3 km || 
|-id=786 bgcolor=#d6d6d6
| 326786 ||  || — || September 17, 2003 || Kitt Peak || Spacewatch || — || align=right | 3.9 km || 
|-id=787 bgcolor=#d6d6d6
| 326787 ||  || — || September 19, 2003 || Kitt Peak || Spacewatch || EOS || align=right | 2.9 km || 
|-id=788 bgcolor=#d6d6d6
| 326788 ||  || — || September 20, 2003 || Socorro || LINEAR || — || align=right | 4.7 km || 
|-id=789 bgcolor=#d6d6d6
| 326789 ||  || — || September 30, 2003 || Socorro || LINEAR || — || align=right | 6.4 km || 
|-id=790 bgcolor=#fefefe
| 326790 ||  || — || September 28, 2003 || Socorro || LINEAR || NYS || align=right data-sort-value="0.79" | 790 m || 
|-id=791 bgcolor=#d6d6d6
| 326791 ||  || — || September 25, 2003 || Palomar || NEAT || — || align=right | 4.0 km || 
|-id=792 bgcolor=#fefefe
| 326792 ||  || — || September 18, 2003 || Palomar || NEAT || — || align=right data-sort-value="0.91" | 910 m || 
|-id=793 bgcolor=#d6d6d6
| 326793 ||  || — || September 28, 2003 || Socorro || LINEAR || — || align=right | 4.5 km || 
|-id=794 bgcolor=#d6d6d6
| 326794 ||  || — || September 29, 2003 || Anderson Mesa || LONEOS || — || align=right | 4.6 km || 
|-id=795 bgcolor=#fefefe
| 326795 ||  || — || September 29, 2003 || Anderson Mesa || LONEOS || — || align=right | 1.0 km || 
|-id=796 bgcolor=#d6d6d6
| 326796 ||  || — || September 17, 2003 || Palomar || NEAT || EOS || align=right | 3.0 km || 
|-id=797 bgcolor=#d6d6d6
| 326797 ||  || — || September 17, 2003 || Palomar || NEAT || MEL || align=right | 2.9 km || 
|-id=798 bgcolor=#fefefe
| 326798 ||  || — || September 18, 2003 || Kitt Peak || Spacewatch || NYS || align=right data-sort-value="0.85" | 850 m || 
|-id=799 bgcolor=#fefefe
| 326799 ||  || — || September 18, 2003 || Socorro || LINEAR || NYS || align=right data-sort-value="0.79" | 790 m || 
|-id=800 bgcolor=#d6d6d6
| 326800 ||  || — || September 18, 2003 || Kitt Peak || Spacewatch || — || align=right | 2.5 km || 
|}

326801–326900 

|-bgcolor=#fefefe
| 326801 ||  || — || September 30, 2003 || Kitt Peak || Spacewatch || FLO || align=right data-sort-value="0.70" | 700 m || 
|-id=802 bgcolor=#d6d6d6
| 326802 ||  || — || September 27, 2003 || Apache Point || SDSS || — || align=right | 5.2 km || 
|-id=803 bgcolor=#d6d6d6
| 326803 ||  || — || September 28, 2003 || Apache Point || SDSS || EOS || align=right | 2.3 km || 
|-id=804 bgcolor=#d6d6d6
| 326804 ||  || — || September 26, 2003 || Apache Point || SDSS || — || align=right | 2.9 km || 
|-id=805 bgcolor=#d6d6d6
| 326805 ||  || — || September 26, 2003 || Apache Point || SDSS || — || align=right | 2.8 km || 
|-id=806 bgcolor=#fefefe
| 326806 ||  || — || September 18, 2003 || Kitt Peak || Spacewatch || V || align=right data-sort-value="0.52" | 520 m || 
|-id=807 bgcolor=#d6d6d6
| 326807 ||  || — || September 26, 2003 || Apache Point || SDSS || — || align=right | 3.6 km || 
|-id=808 bgcolor=#d6d6d6
| 326808 ||  || — || September 26, 2003 || Apache Point || SDSS || — || align=right | 3.3 km || 
|-id=809 bgcolor=#d6d6d6
| 326809 ||  || — || September 28, 2003 || Apache Point || SDSS || VER || align=right | 3.3 km || 
|-id=810 bgcolor=#d6d6d6
| 326810 ||  || — || September 28, 2003 || Kitt Peak || Spacewatch || — || align=right | 2.6 km || 
|-id=811 bgcolor=#d6d6d6
| 326811 ||  || — || September 16, 2003 || Kitt Peak || Spacewatch || — || align=right | 3.0 km || 
|-id=812 bgcolor=#d6d6d6
| 326812 ||  || — || October 4, 2003 || Kingsnake || J. V. McClusky || — || align=right | 6.7 km || 
|-id=813 bgcolor=#fefefe
| 326813 ||  || — || October 2, 2003 || Kitt Peak || Spacewatch || FLO || align=right data-sort-value="0.65" | 650 m || 
|-id=814 bgcolor=#d6d6d6
| 326814 ||  || — || October 13, 2003 || Junk Bond || D. Healy || — || align=right | 3.9 km || 
|-id=815 bgcolor=#d6d6d6
| 326815 ||  || — || October 15, 2003 || Palomar || NEAT || THM || align=right | 2.5 km || 
|-id=816 bgcolor=#d6d6d6
| 326816 ||  || — || October 1, 2003 || Kitt Peak || Spacewatch || — || align=right | 2.9 km || 
|-id=817 bgcolor=#d6d6d6
| 326817 ||  || — || October 1, 2003 || Kitt Peak || Spacewatch || — || align=right | 3.7 km || 
|-id=818 bgcolor=#d6d6d6
| 326818 ||  || — || October 2, 2003 || Kitt Peak || Spacewatch || — || align=right | 5.2 km || 
|-id=819 bgcolor=#d6d6d6
| 326819 ||  || — || October 3, 2003 || Kitt Peak || Spacewatch || — || align=right | 4.4 km || 
|-id=820 bgcolor=#d6d6d6
| 326820 ||  || — || October 3, 2003 || Kitt Peak || Spacewatch || — || align=right | 4.2 km || 
|-id=821 bgcolor=#d6d6d6
| 326821 ||  || — || October 4, 2003 || Kitt Peak || Spacewatch || — || align=right | 3.5 km || 
|-id=822 bgcolor=#d6d6d6
| 326822 ||  || — || October 5, 2003 || Kitt Peak || Spacewatch || — || align=right | 3.7 km || 
|-id=823 bgcolor=#d6d6d6
| 326823 ||  || — || October 5, 2003 || Kitt Peak || Spacewatch || — || align=right | 4.2 km || 
|-id=824 bgcolor=#d6d6d6
| 326824 ||  || — || October 5, 2003 || Kitt Peak || Spacewatch || VER || align=right | 3.2 km || 
|-id=825 bgcolor=#d6d6d6
| 326825 ||  || — || October 15, 2003 || Palomar || NEAT || — || align=right | 3.6 km || 
|-id=826 bgcolor=#d6d6d6
| 326826 ||  || — || October 16, 2003 || Kitt Peak || Spacewatch || — || align=right | 4.2 km || 
|-id=827 bgcolor=#d6d6d6
| 326827 ||  || — || October 18, 2003 || Junk Bond || D. Healy || CRO || align=right | 3.4 km || 
|-id=828 bgcolor=#fefefe
| 326828 ||  || — || October 23, 2003 || Socorro || LINEAR || H || align=right data-sort-value="0.80" | 800 m || 
|-id=829 bgcolor=#fefefe
| 326829 ||  || — || October 25, 2003 || Goodricke-Pigott || R. A. Tucker || PHO || align=right | 1.4 km || 
|-id=830 bgcolor=#d6d6d6
| 326830 ||  || — || October 16, 2003 || Goodricke-Pigott || R. A. Tucker || — || align=right | 4.5 km || 
|-id=831 bgcolor=#d6d6d6
| 326831 ||  || — || October 24, 2003 || Socorro || LINEAR || 7:4 || align=right | 5.2 km || 
|-id=832 bgcolor=#fefefe
| 326832 ||  || — || October 21, 2003 || Goodricke-Pigott || R. A. Tucker || — || align=right data-sort-value="0.81" | 810 m || 
|-id=833 bgcolor=#fefefe
| 326833 ||  || — || October 16, 2003 || Anderson Mesa || LONEOS || — || align=right | 1.0 km || 
|-id=834 bgcolor=#d6d6d6
| 326834 ||  || — || October 18, 2003 || Palomar || NEAT || — || align=right | 5.0 km || 
|-id=835 bgcolor=#d6d6d6
| 326835 ||  || — || October 16, 2003 || Palomar || NEAT || EUP || align=right | 4.3 km || 
|-id=836 bgcolor=#fefefe
| 326836 ||  || — || October 18, 2003 || Kitt Peak || Spacewatch || — || align=right data-sort-value="0.62" | 620 m || 
|-id=837 bgcolor=#fefefe
| 326837 ||  || — || October 17, 2003 || Kitt Peak || Spacewatch || FLO || align=right data-sort-value="0.69" | 690 m || 
|-id=838 bgcolor=#fefefe
| 326838 ||  || — || October 17, 2003 || Kitt Peak || Spacewatch || — || align=right | 1.3 km || 
|-id=839 bgcolor=#fefefe
| 326839 ||  || — || October 17, 2003 || Goodricke-Pigott || R. A. Tucker || — || align=right | 1.1 km || 
|-id=840 bgcolor=#fefefe
| 326840 ||  || — || October 20, 2003 || Socorro || LINEAR || FLO || align=right data-sort-value="0.63" | 630 m || 
|-id=841 bgcolor=#d6d6d6
| 326841 ||  || — || October 20, 2003 || Socorro || LINEAR || — || align=right | 4.1 km || 
|-id=842 bgcolor=#fefefe
| 326842 ||  || — || October 20, 2003 || Socorro || LINEAR || NYS || align=right data-sort-value="0.70" | 700 m || 
|-id=843 bgcolor=#d6d6d6
| 326843 ||  || — || October 20, 2003 || Socorro || LINEAR || — || align=right | 3.7 km || 
|-id=844 bgcolor=#d6d6d6
| 326844 ||  || — || October 21, 2003 || Socorro || LINEAR || — || align=right | 3.7 km || 
|-id=845 bgcolor=#fefefe
| 326845 ||  || — || October 5, 2003 || Kitt Peak || Spacewatch || — || align=right data-sort-value="0.64" | 640 m || 
|-id=846 bgcolor=#fefefe
| 326846 ||  || — || October 18, 2003 || Palomar || NEAT || — || align=right | 1.2 km || 
|-id=847 bgcolor=#fefefe
| 326847 ||  || — || October 21, 2003 || Socorro || LINEAR || — || align=right data-sort-value="0.78" | 780 m || 
|-id=848 bgcolor=#d6d6d6
| 326848 ||  || — || October 18, 2003 || Anderson Mesa || LONEOS || — || align=right | 4.7 km || 
|-id=849 bgcolor=#fefefe
| 326849 ||  || — || October 20, 2003 || Kitt Peak || Spacewatch || FLO || align=right data-sort-value="0.61" | 610 m || 
|-id=850 bgcolor=#d6d6d6
| 326850 ||  || — || October 20, 2003 || Socorro || LINEAR || — || align=right | 4.4 km || 
|-id=851 bgcolor=#fefefe
| 326851 ||  || — || October 22, 2003 || Socorro || LINEAR || — || align=right data-sort-value="0.95" | 950 m || 
|-id=852 bgcolor=#d6d6d6
| 326852 ||  || — || October 21, 2003 || Anderson Mesa || LONEOS || — || align=right | 5.2 km || 
|-id=853 bgcolor=#d6d6d6
| 326853 ||  || — || October 21, 2003 || Palomar || NEAT || HYG || align=right | 3.7 km || 
|-id=854 bgcolor=#fefefe
| 326854 ||  || — || October 22, 2003 || Kitt Peak || Spacewatch || V || align=right data-sort-value="0.85" | 850 m || 
|-id=855 bgcolor=#fefefe
| 326855 ||  || — || October 22, 2003 || Socorro || LINEAR || ERI || align=right | 2.0 km || 
|-id=856 bgcolor=#d6d6d6
| 326856 ||  || — || October 22, 2003 || Socorro || LINEAR || — || align=right | 5.0 km || 
|-id=857 bgcolor=#fefefe
| 326857 ||  || — || October 24, 2003 || Socorro || LINEAR || — || align=right | 2.9 km || 
|-id=858 bgcolor=#d6d6d6
| 326858 ||  || — || October 21, 2003 || Socorro || LINEAR || — || align=right | 4.0 km || 
|-id=859 bgcolor=#fefefe
| 326859 ||  || — || October 21, 2003 || Socorro || LINEAR || — || align=right | 1.1 km || 
|-id=860 bgcolor=#fefefe
| 326860 ||  || — || October 22, 2003 || Socorro || LINEAR || — || align=right | 1.0 km || 
|-id=861 bgcolor=#fefefe
| 326861 ||  || — || October 22, 2003 || Kitt Peak || Spacewatch || — || align=right data-sort-value="0.89" | 890 m || 
|-id=862 bgcolor=#fefefe
| 326862 ||  || — || October 23, 2003 || Kitt Peak || Spacewatch || NYS || align=right data-sort-value="0.71" | 710 m || 
|-id=863 bgcolor=#d6d6d6
| 326863 ||  || — || October 22, 2003 || Kitt Peak || Spacewatch || — || align=right | 3.4 km || 
|-id=864 bgcolor=#d6d6d6
| 326864 ||  || — || October 22, 2003 || Kitt Peak || Spacewatch || — || align=right | 3.1 km || 
|-id=865 bgcolor=#d6d6d6
| 326865 ||  || — || October 23, 2003 || Kitt Peak || Spacewatch || — || align=right | 4.7 km || 
|-id=866 bgcolor=#fefefe
| 326866 ||  || — || October 24, 2003 || Kitt Peak || Spacewatch || — || align=right data-sort-value="0.79" | 790 m || 
|-id=867 bgcolor=#fefefe
| 326867 ||  || — || October 24, 2003 || Socorro || LINEAR || — || align=right | 1.0 km || 
|-id=868 bgcolor=#d6d6d6
| 326868 ||  || — || October 25, 2003 || Kitt Peak || Spacewatch || HYG || align=right | 3.0 km || 
|-id=869 bgcolor=#fefefe
| 326869 ||  || — || October 25, 2003 || Socorro || LINEAR || — || align=right data-sort-value="0.83" | 830 m || 
|-id=870 bgcolor=#d6d6d6
| 326870 ||  || — || October 17, 2003 || Palomar || NEAT || — || align=right | 3.8 km || 
|-id=871 bgcolor=#d6d6d6
| 326871 ||  || — || October 21, 2003 || Anderson Mesa || LONEOS || TIR || align=right | 4.2 km || 
|-id=872 bgcolor=#fefefe
| 326872 ||  || — || October 2, 2003 || Kitt Peak || Spacewatch || — || align=right data-sort-value="0.80" | 800 m || 
|-id=873 bgcolor=#d6d6d6
| 326873 ||  || — || October 17, 2003 || Kitt Peak || Spacewatch || — || align=right | 3.7 km || 
|-id=874 bgcolor=#d6d6d6
| 326874 ||  || — || October 24, 2003 || Kitt Peak || M. W. Buie || — || align=right | 5.8 km || 
|-id=875 bgcolor=#fefefe
| 326875 ||  || — || October 18, 2003 || Apache Point || SDSS || — || align=right data-sort-value="0.76" | 760 m || 
|-id=876 bgcolor=#fefefe
| 326876 ||  || — || October 18, 2003 || Apache Point || SDSS || — || align=right data-sort-value="0.73" | 730 m || 
|-id=877 bgcolor=#fefefe
| 326877 ||  || — || October 18, 2003 || Kitt Peak || Spacewatch || NYS || align=right data-sort-value="0.53" | 530 m || 
|-id=878 bgcolor=#d6d6d6
| 326878 ||  || — || October 19, 2003 || Apache Point || SDSS || — || align=right | 2.9 km || 
|-id=879 bgcolor=#d6d6d6
| 326879 ||  || — || September 28, 2003 || Kitt Peak || Spacewatch || — || align=right | 3.6 km || 
|-id=880 bgcolor=#d6d6d6
| 326880 ||  || — || October 20, 2003 || Kitt Peak || Spacewatch || — || align=right | 3.8 km || 
|-id=881 bgcolor=#d6d6d6
| 326881 ||  || — || October 22, 2003 || Apache Point || SDSS || — || align=right | 3.3 km || 
|-id=882 bgcolor=#d6d6d6
| 326882 ||  || — || October 22, 2003 || Apache Point || SDSS || — || align=right | 3.1 km || 
|-id=883 bgcolor=#d6d6d6
| 326883 ||  || — || October 22, 2003 || Kitt Peak || Spacewatch || — || align=right | 2.9 km || 
|-id=884 bgcolor=#d6d6d6
| 326884 ||  || — || October 22, 2003 || Apache Point || SDSS || — || align=right | 3.2 km || 
|-id=885 bgcolor=#d6d6d6
| 326885 ||  || — || November 2, 2003 || Socorro || LINEAR || — || align=right | 4.0 km || 
|-id=886 bgcolor=#d6d6d6
| 326886 ||  || — || November 16, 2003 || Kitt Peak || Spacewatch || THM || align=right | 2.5 km || 
|-id=887 bgcolor=#FA8072
| 326887 ||  || — || November 18, 2003 || Kitt Peak || Spacewatch || — || align=right data-sort-value="0.83" | 830 m || 
|-id=888 bgcolor=#fefefe
| 326888 ||  || — || October 29, 2003 || Socorro || LINEAR || — || align=right data-sort-value="0.83" | 830 m || 
|-id=889 bgcolor=#d6d6d6
| 326889 ||  || — || November 16, 2003 || Kitt Peak || Spacewatch || VER || align=right | 3.5 km || 
|-id=890 bgcolor=#d6d6d6
| 326890 ||  || — || November 18, 2003 || Palomar || NEAT || MEL || align=right | 4.7 km || 
|-id=891 bgcolor=#d6d6d6
| 326891 ||  || — || November 19, 2003 || Socorro || LINEAR || — || align=right | 4.2 km || 
|-id=892 bgcolor=#d6d6d6
| 326892 ||  || — || November 18, 2003 || Kitt Peak || Spacewatch || — || align=right | 5.3 km || 
|-id=893 bgcolor=#d6d6d6
| 326893 ||  || — || November 18, 2003 || Kitt Peak || Spacewatch || — || align=right | 4.3 km || 
|-id=894 bgcolor=#fefefe
| 326894 ||  || — || November 20, 2003 || Palomar || NEAT || — || align=right | 1.6 km || 
|-id=895 bgcolor=#fefefe
| 326895 ||  || — || November 16, 2003 || Kitt Peak || Spacewatch || V || align=right data-sort-value="0.71" | 710 m || 
|-id=896 bgcolor=#fefefe
| 326896 ||  || — || November 19, 2003 || Palomar || NEAT || — || align=right | 1.1 km || 
|-id=897 bgcolor=#fefefe
| 326897 ||  || — || November 19, 2003 || Kitt Peak || Spacewatch || — || align=right data-sort-value="0.67" | 670 m || 
|-id=898 bgcolor=#d6d6d6
| 326898 ||  || — || November 20, 2003 || Socorro || LINEAR || — || align=right | 3.9 km || 
|-id=899 bgcolor=#fefefe
| 326899 ||  || — || November 20, 2003 || Socorro || LINEAR || V || align=right data-sort-value="0.84" | 840 m || 
|-id=900 bgcolor=#fefefe
| 326900 ||  || — || November 18, 2003 || Kitt Peak || Spacewatch || V || align=right data-sort-value="0.76" | 760 m || 
|}

326901–327000 

|-bgcolor=#d6d6d6
| 326901 ||  || — || November 20, 2003 || Socorro || LINEAR || — || align=right | 3.7 km || 
|-id=902 bgcolor=#fefefe
| 326902 ||  || — || November 16, 2003 || Catalina || CSS || FLO || align=right data-sort-value="0.75" | 750 m || 
|-id=903 bgcolor=#d6d6d6
| 326903 ||  || — || November 19, 2003 || Anderson Mesa || LONEOS || — || align=right | 4.2 km || 
|-id=904 bgcolor=#fefefe
| 326904 ||  || — || November 20, 2003 || Socorro || LINEAR || — || align=right | 2.6 km || 
|-id=905 bgcolor=#fefefe
| 326905 ||  || — || November 20, 2003 || Socorro || LINEAR || ERI || align=right | 1.9 km || 
|-id=906 bgcolor=#d6d6d6
| 326906 ||  || — || November 23, 2003 || Socorro || LINEAR || — || align=right | 4.5 km || 
|-id=907 bgcolor=#fefefe
| 326907 ||  || — || November 24, 2003 || Anderson Mesa || LONEOS || FLO || align=right data-sort-value="0.80" | 800 m || 
|-id=908 bgcolor=#d6d6d6
| 326908 ||  || — || November 30, 2003 || Kitt Peak || Spacewatch || — || align=right | 3.0 km || 
|-id=909 bgcolor=#fefefe
| 326909 ||  || — || November 30, 2003 || Socorro || LINEAR || — || align=right | 1.0 km || 
|-id=910 bgcolor=#d6d6d6
| 326910 ||  || — || November 23, 2003 || Anderson Mesa || LONEOS || — || align=right | 4.2 km || 
|-id=911 bgcolor=#fefefe
| 326911 ||  || — || November 30, 2003 || Socorro || LINEAR || — || align=right | 1.0 km || 
|-id=912 bgcolor=#fefefe
| 326912 ||  || — || November 30, 2003 || Socorro || LINEAR || — || align=right data-sort-value="0.94" | 940 m || 
|-id=913 bgcolor=#fefefe
| 326913 ||  || — || December 1, 2003 || Socorro || LINEAR || — || align=right | 1.1 km || 
|-id=914 bgcolor=#fefefe
| 326914 ||  || — || December 14, 2003 || Palomar || NEAT || — || align=right data-sort-value="0.75" | 750 m || 
|-id=915 bgcolor=#d6d6d6
| 326915 ||  || — || December 28, 2003 || Kitt Peak || Spacewatch || TIR || align=right | 4.0 km || 
|-id=916 bgcolor=#fefefe
| 326916 ||  || — || December 19, 2003 || Socorro || LINEAR || PHO || align=right | 1.2 km || 
|-id=917 bgcolor=#d6d6d6
| 326917 ||  || — || December 17, 2003 || Kitt Peak || Spacewatch || — || align=right | 4.9 km || 
|-id=918 bgcolor=#fefefe
| 326918 ||  || — || December 19, 2003 || Haleakala || NEAT || — || align=right | 1.3 km || 
|-id=919 bgcolor=#fefefe
| 326919 ||  || — || December 19, 2003 || Socorro || LINEAR || — || align=right data-sort-value="0.93" | 930 m || 
|-id=920 bgcolor=#fefefe
| 326920 ||  || — || December 18, 2003 || Socorro || LINEAR || — || align=right data-sort-value="0.91" | 910 m || 
|-id=921 bgcolor=#d6d6d6
| 326921 ||  || — || December 21, 2003 || Socorro || LINEAR || — || align=right | 4.9 km || 
|-id=922 bgcolor=#fefefe
| 326922 ||  || — || December 28, 2003 || Socorro || LINEAR || ERI || align=right | 1.5 km || 
|-id=923 bgcolor=#E9E9E9
| 326923 ||  || — || December 28, 2003 || Socorro || LINEAR || — || align=right | 1.3 km || 
|-id=924 bgcolor=#d6d6d6
| 326924 ||  || — || December 17, 2003 || Kitt Peak || Spacewatch || EOS || align=right | 2.4 km || 
|-id=925 bgcolor=#fefefe
| 326925 ||  || — || January 17, 2004 || Palomar || NEAT || H || align=right data-sort-value="0.99" | 990 m || 
|-id=926 bgcolor=#fefefe
| 326926 ||  || — || January 18, 2004 || Palomar || NEAT || NYS || align=right data-sort-value="0.82" | 820 m || 
|-id=927 bgcolor=#fefefe
| 326927 ||  || — || January 18, 2004 || Palomar || NEAT || V || align=right data-sort-value="0.88" | 880 m || 
|-id=928 bgcolor=#fefefe
| 326928 ||  || — || January 21, 2004 || Socorro || LINEAR || — || align=right data-sort-value="0.91" | 910 m || 
|-id=929 bgcolor=#fefefe
| 326929 ||  || — || January 22, 2004 || Socorro || LINEAR || — || align=right | 1.3 km || 
|-id=930 bgcolor=#fefefe
| 326930 ||  || — || January 24, 2004 || Socorro || LINEAR || — || align=right | 1.0 km || 
|-id=931 bgcolor=#E9E9E9
| 326931 ||  || — || January 24, 2004 || Socorro || LINEAR || — || align=right | 1.6 km || 
|-id=932 bgcolor=#fefefe
| 326932 ||  || — || January 24, 2004 || Socorro || LINEAR || — || align=right | 1.0 km || 
|-id=933 bgcolor=#fefefe
| 326933 ||  || — || January 19, 2004 || Kitt Peak || Spacewatch || MAS || align=right data-sort-value="0.82" | 820 m || 
|-id=934 bgcolor=#fefefe
| 326934 ||  || — || February 10, 2004 || Palomar || NEAT || — || align=right | 1.0 km || 
|-id=935 bgcolor=#fefefe
| 326935 ||  || — || February 11, 2004 || Palomar || NEAT || — || align=right | 1.1 km || 
|-id=936 bgcolor=#fefefe
| 326936 ||  || — || February 11, 2004 || Palomar || NEAT || NYS || align=right data-sort-value="0.69" | 690 m || 
|-id=937 bgcolor=#fefefe
| 326937 ||  || — || February 13, 2004 || Kitt Peak || Spacewatch || — || align=right data-sort-value="0.76" | 760 m || 
|-id=938 bgcolor=#fefefe
| 326938 ||  || — || January 23, 2004 || Socorro || LINEAR || — || align=right | 1.0 km || 
|-id=939 bgcolor=#fefefe
| 326939 ||  || — || February 11, 2004 || Kitt Peak || Spacewatch || — || align=right | 1.0 km || 
|-id=940 bgcolor=#fefefe
| 326940 ||  || — || February 11, 2004 || Kitt Peak || Spacewatch || — || align=right | 1.4 km || 
|-id=941 bgcolor=#fefefe
| 326941 ||  || — || February 12, 2004 || Kitt Peak || Spacewatch || V || align=right data-sort-value="0.71" | 710 m || 
|-id=942 bgcolor=#fefefe
| 326942 ||  || — || February 12, 2004 || Kitt Peak || Spacewatch || MAS || align=right data-sort-value="0.77" | 770 m || 
|-id=943 bgcolor=#fefefe
| 326943 ||  || — || February 17, 2004 || Kitt Peak || Spacewatch || NYS || align=right data-sort-value="0.84" | 840 m || 
|-id=944 bgcolor=#fefefe
| 326944 ||  || — || February 17, 2004 || Catalina || CSS || — || align=right | 1.0 km || 
|-id=945 bgcolor=#fefefe
| 326945 ||  || — || February 22, 2004 || Kitt Peak || Spacewatch || MAS || align=right data-sort-value="0.94" | 940 m || 
|-id=946 bgcolor=#FFC2E0
| 326946 ||  || — || March 15, 2004 || Palomar || NEAT || AMO || align=right data-sort-value="0.74" | 740 m || 
|-id=947 bgcolor=#fefefe
| 326947 ||  || — || March 15, 2004 || Kitt Peak || Spacewatch || — || align=right | 1.1 km || 
|-id=948 bgcolor=#fefefe
| 326948 ||  || — || March 17, 2004 || Socorro || LINEAR || H || align=right data-sort-value="0.71" | 710 m || 
|-id=949 bgcolor=#fefefe
| 326949 ||  || — || March 17, 2004 || Socorro || LINEAR || H || align=right data-sort-value="0.70" | 700 m || 
|-id=950 bgcolor=#fefefe
| 326950 ||  || — || March 16, 2004 || Kitt Peak || Spacewatch || NYS || align=right data-sort-value="0.53" | 530 m || 
|-id=951 bgcolor=#fefefe
| 326951 ||  || — || March 23, 2004 || Socorro || LINEAR || H || align=right data-sort-value="0.53" | 530 m || 
|-id=952 bgcolor=#fefefe
| 326952 ||  || — || March 19, 2004 || Socorro || LINEAR || — || align=right data-sort-value="0.79" | 790 m || 
|-id=953 bgcolor=#fefefe
| 326953 ||  || — || March 20, 2004 || Socorro || LINEAR || V || align=right | 1.1 km || 
|-id=954 bgcolor=#fefefe
| 326954 ||  || — || March 22, 2004 || Anderson Mesa || LONEOS || — || align=right | 1.2 km || 
|-id=955 bgcolor=#fefefe
| 326955 ||  || — || April 12, 2004 || Socorro || LINEAR || H || align=right data-sort-value="0.91" | 910 m || 
|-id=956 bgcolor=#fefefe
| 326956 ||  || — || April 12, 2004 || Socorro || LINEAR || H || align=right data-sort-value="0.76" | 760 m || 
|-id=957 bgcolor=#E9E9E9
| 326957 ||  || — || April 12, 2004 || Siding Spring || SSS || — || align=right | 1.3 km || 
|-id=958 bgcolor=#E9E9E9
| 326958 ||  || — || April 12, 2004 || Kitt Peak || Spacewatch || — || align=right data-sort-value="0.83" | 830 m || 
|-id=959 bgcolor=#fefefe
| 326959 ||  || — || April 19, 2004 || Socorro || LINEAR || H || align=right | 1.1 km || 
|-id=960 bgcolor=#E9E9E9
| 326960 ||  || — || April 22, 2004 || Desert Eagle || W. K. Y. Yeung || — || align=right | 1.4 km || 
|-id=961 bgcolor=#E9E9E9
| 326961 ||  || — || April 25, 2004 || Kitt Peak || Spacewatch || — || align=right | 1.1 km || 
|-id=962 bgcolor=#FA8072
| 326962 ||  || — || May 11, 2004 || Socorro || LINEAR || H || align=right data-sort-value="0.89" | 890 m || 
|-id=963 bgcolor=#E9E9E9
| 326963 ||  || — || May 13, 2004 || Socorro || LINEAR || — || align=right | 2.4 km || 
|-id=964 bgcolor=#E9E9E9
| 326964 ||  || — || May 9, 2004 || Kitt Peak || Spacewatch || — || align=right | 1.2 km || 
|-id=965 bgcolor=#E9E9E9
| 326965 ||  || — || May 13, 2004 || Kitt Peak || Spacewatch || — || align=right | 1.4 km || 
|-id=966 bgcolor=#E9E9E9
| 326966 ||  || — || May 14, 2004 || Socorro || LINEAR || ADE || align=right | 2.3 km || 
|-id=967 bgcolor=#E9E9E9
| 326967 ||  || — || May 14, 2004 || Catalina || CSS || — || align=right | 1.1 km || 
|-id=968 bgcolor=#E9E9E9
| 326968 ||  || — || May 9, 2004 || Kitt Peak || Spacewatch || — || align=right data-sort-value="0.96" | 960 m || 
|-id=969 bgcolor=#E9E9E9
| 326969 ||  || — || May 12, 2004 || Anderson Mesa || LONEOS || — || align=right | 1.3 km || 
|-id=970 bgcolor=#E9E9E9
| 326970 ||  || — || May 15, 2004 || Socorro || LINEAR || — || align=right | 1.6 km || 
|-id=971 bgcolor=#E9E9E9
| 326971 ||  || — || May 21, 2004 || Kitt Peak || Spacewatch || — || align=right | 1.3 km || 
|-id=972 bgcolor=#E9E9E9
| 326972 ||  || — || June 12, 2004 || Socorro || LINEAR || EUN || align=right | 1.4 km || 
|-id=973 bgcolor=#E9E9E9
| 326973 ||  || — || June 11, 2004 || Socorro || LINEAR || JUN || align=right | 1.6 km || 
|-id=974 bgcolor=#E9E9E9
| 326974 ||  || — || June 14, 2004 || Socorro || LINEAR || — || align=right | 1.2 km || 
|-id=975 bgcolor=#E9E9E9
| 326975 || 2004 MJ || — || June 17, 2004 || Wrightwood || D. Mayes || — || align=right | 3.2 km || 
|-id=976 bgcolor=#E9E9E9
| 326976 ||  || — || June 20, 2004 || Bergisch Gladbac || W. Bickel || — || align=right | 1.4 km || 
|-id=977 bgcolor=#E9E9E9
| 326977 ||  || — || July 9, 2004 || Socorro || LINEAR || — || align=right | 3.7 km || 
|-id=978 bgcolor=#E9E9E9
| 326978 ||  || — || July 10, 2004 || Palomar || NEAT || EUN || align=right | 1.7 km || 
|-id=979 bgcolor=#E9E9E9
| 326979 ||  || — || July 11, 2004 || Socorro || LINEAR || — || align=right | 2.3 km || 
|-id=980 bgcolor=#E9E9E9
| 326980 ||  || — || July 14, 2004 || Socorro || LINEAR || ADE || align=right | 2.9 km || 
|-id=981 bgcolor=#E9E9E9
| 326981 ||  || — || July 16, 2004 || Socorro || LINEAR || — || align=right | 2.4 km || 
|-id=982 bgcolor=#E9E9E9
| 326982 ||  || — || July 29, 2004 || Siding Spring || SSS || ADE || align=right | 2.8 km || 
|-id=983 bgcolor=#E9E9E9
| 326983 ||  || — || August 5, 2004 || Palomar || NEAT || JUN || align=right | 1.2 km || 
|-id=984 bgcolor=#E9E9E9
| 326984 ||  || — || August 6, 2004 || Palomar || NEAT || — || align=right | 1.6 km || 
|-id=985 bgcolor=#E9E9E9
| 326985 ||  || — || August 6, 2004 || Palomar || NEAT || EUN || align=right | 1.3 km || 
|-id=986 bgcolor=#E9E9E9
| 326986 ||  || — || August 9, 2004 || Socorro || LINEAR || — || align=right | 5.3 km || 
|-id=987 bgcolor=#E9E9E9
| 326987 ||  || — || August 9, 2004 || Socorro || LINEAR || — || align=right | 1.9 km || 
|-id=988 bgcolor=#E9E9E9
| 326988 ||  || — || August 9, 2004 || Socorro || LINEAR || — || align=right | 2.5 km || 
|-id=989 bgcolor=#E9E9E9
| 326989 ||  || — || August 9, 2004 || Socorro || LINEAR || — || align=right | 2.4 km || 
|-id=990 bgcolor=#E9E9E9
| 326990 ||  || — || August 9, 2004 || Socorro || LINEAR || — || align=right | 3.1 km || 
|-id=991 bgcolor=#E9E9E9
| 326991 ||  || — || August 9, 2004 || Socorro || LINEAR || — || align=right | 2.0 km || 
|-id=992 bgcolor=#E9E9E9
| 326992 ||  || — || August 11, 2004 || Socorro || LINEAR || — || align=right | 2.1 km || 
|-id=993 bgcolor=#E9E9E9
| 326993 ||  || — || August 11, 2004 || Socorro || LINEAR || — || align=right | 1.7 km || 
|-id=994 bgcolor=#E9E9E9
| 326994 ||  || — || August 12, 2004 || Socorro || LINEAR || — || align=right | 2.9 km || 
|-id=995 bgcolor=#E9E9E9
| 326995 ||  || — || August 13, 2004 || Palomar || NEAT || — || align=right | 1.5 km || 
|-id=996 bgcolor=#E9E9E9
| 326996 ||  || — || August 20, 2004 || Siding Spring || SSS || — || align=right | 2.3 km || 
|-id=997 bgcolor=#E9E9E9
| 326997 ||  || — || August 20, 2004 || Kitt Peak || Spacewatch || — || align=right | 2.9 km || 
|-id=998 bgcolor=#E9E9E9
| 326998 ||  || — || August 20, 2004 || Catalina || CSS || — || align=right | 2.6 km || 
|-id=999 bgcolor=#E9E9E9
| 326999 ||  || — || August 25, 2004 || Kitt Peak || Spacewatch || — || align=right | 2.4 km || 
|-id=000 bgcolor=#E9E9E9
| 327000 ||  || — || September 4, 2004 || Palomar || NEAT || — || align=right | 3.1 km || 
|}

References

External links 
 Discovery Circumstances: Numbered Minor Planets (325001)–(330000) (IAU Minor Planet Center)

0326